This is a list of municipalities in the Czech Republic. Every name is followed by the official status and the district in which it is located.

A

Abertamy (town; Karlovy Vary)
Adamov (town; Blansko)
Adamov (České Budějovice)
Adamov (Kutná Hora)
Adršpach (Náchod)
Albrechtice (Karviná)
Albrechtice (Ústí nad Orlicí)
Albrechtice nad Orlicí (Rychnov nad Kněžnou)
Albrechtice nad Vltavou (Písek)
Albrechtice v Jizerských horách (Jablonec nad Nisou)
Albrechtičky (Nový Jičín)
Alojzov (Prostějov)
Andělská Hora (town; Bruntál)
Andělská Hora (Karlovy Vary)
Anenská Studánka (Ústí nad Orlicí)
Archlebov (Hodonín)
Arneštovice (Pelhřimov)
Arnolec (Jihlava)
Arnoltice (Děčín)
Aš (town; Cheb)

B

Babice (Hradec Králové)
Babice (Olomouc)
Babice (Prague-East)
Babice (Prachatice)
Babice (Třebíč)
Babice (Uherské Hradiště)
Babice nad Svitavou (Brno-Country)
Babice u Rosic (Brno-Country)
Babylon (Domažlice)
Bácovice (Pelhřimov)
Bačalky (Jičín)
Bačetín (Rychnov nad Kněžnou)
Bačice (Třebíč)
Bačkov (Havlíčkův Brod)
Bačkovice (Třebíč)
Bakov nad Jizerou (town; Mladá Boleslav)
Baliny (Žďár nad Sázavou)
Balkova Lhota (Tábor)
Banín (Svitavy)
Bánov (Uherské Hradiště)
Báňovice (Jindřichův Hradec)
Bantice (Znojmo)
Barchov (Hradec Králové)
Barchov (Pardubice)
Barchovice (Kolín)
Bartošovice v Orlických horách (Rychnov nad Kněžnou)
Bartošovice (Nový Jičín)
Bartoušov (Havlíčkův Brod)
Bařice-Velké Těšany (Kroměříž)
Baška (Frýdek-Místek)
Bašnice (Jičín)
Bašť (Prague-East)
Batelov (market town; Jihlava)
Batňovice (Trutnov)
Bavorov (town; Strakonice)
Bavory (Břeclav)
Bavoryně (Beroun)
Bdeněves (Plzeň-North)
Bdín (Rakovník)
Běchary (Jičín)
Bechlín (Litoměřice)
Bechyně (town; Tábor)
Bečice (České Budějovice)
Bečice (Tábor)
Bečov nad Teplou (town; Karlovy Vary)
Bečov (Most)
Bečváry (Kolín)
Bedihošť (Prostějov)
Bednárec (Jindřichův Hradec)
Bednáreček (Jindřichův Hradec)
Bedřichov (Blansko)
Bedřichov (Jablonec nad Nisou)
Běhařov (Klatovy)
Běhařovice (market town; Znojmo)
Bělá (Havlíčkův Brod)
Bělá (Opava)
Bělá (Pelhřimov)
Bělá (Semily)
Bělá nad Radbuzou (town; Domažlice)
Bělá nad Svitavou (Svitavy)
Bělá pod Bezdězem (town; Mladá Boleslav)
Bělá pod Pradědem (Jeseník)
Bělá u Jevíčka (Svitavy)
Bělčice (town; Strakonice)
Běleč (Brno-Country)
Běleč (Kladno)
Běleč (Tábor)
Běleč nad Orlicí (Hradec Králové)
Bělkovice-Lašťany (Olomouc)
Běloky (Kladno)
Bělotín (Přerov)
Bělov (Kroměříž)
Bělušice (Kolín)
Bělušice (Most)
Benátky (Hradec Králové)
Benátky (Svitavy)
Benátky nad Jizerou (town; Mladá Boleslav)
Benecko (Semily)
Benešov (town; Benešov)
Benešov (Blansko)
Benešov nad Černou (Český Krumlov)
Benešov nad Ploučnicí (town; Děčín)
Benešov u Semil (Semily)
Benešovice (Tachov)
Benetice (Třebíč) 
Benetice (Havlíčkův Brod)
Beňov (Přerov)
Bernardov (Kutná Hora)
Bernartice (Benešov)
Bernartice (Jeseník)
Bernartice (market town; Písek)
Bernartice (Trutnov)
Bernartice nad Odrou (Nový Jičín)
Beroun (town; Beroun)
Běrunice (Nymburk)
Beřovice (Kladno)
Besednice (market town; Český Krumlov)
Běstovice (Ústí nad Orlicí)
Běstvina (Chrudim)
Běšiny (Klatovy)
Běštín (Beroun)
Bezděčí u Trnávky (Svitavy)
Bezdědovice (Strakonice)
Bezděkov (Havlíčkův Brod)
Bezděkov (Klatovy)
Bezděkov (Pardubice)
Bezděkov (Rokycany)
Bezděkov nad Metují (Náchod)
Bezděkov pod Třemšínem (Příbram)
Bezděz (Česká Lípa)
Bezdružice (town; Tachov)
Bezkov (Znojmo)
Bezměrov (Kroměříž)
Bezno (market town; Mladá Boleslav)
Bezuchov (Přerov)
Bezvěrov (Plzeň-North)
Bílá (Frýdek-Místek)
Bílá (Liberec)
Bílá Hlína (Mladá Boleslav)
Bílá Lhota (Olomouc)
Bílá Třemešná (Trutnov)
Bílá Voda (Jeseník)
Bílčice (Bruntál)
Bílé Podolí (market town; Kutná Hora)
Bílé Poličany (Trutnov)
Bílence (Chomutov)
Bílichov (Kladno)
Bílina (town; Teplice)
Bílkovice (Benešov)
Bílov (Nový Jičín)
Bílov (Plzeň-North)
Bílovec (town; Nový Jičín)
Bílovice-Lutotín (Prostějov)
Bílovice nad Svitavou (Brno-Country)
Bílovice (Uherské Hradiště)
Bílsko (Olomouc)
Bílsko (Strakonice)
Bílsko u Hořic (Jičín)
Bílý Kámen (Jihlava)
Bílý Kostel nad Nisou (Liberec)
Bílý Potok (Liberec)
Bílý Újezd (Rychnov nad Kněžnou)
Biřkov (Klatovy)
Biskoupky (Brno-Country)
Biskupice-Pulkov (Třebíč)
Biskupice (Chrudim)
Biskupice (Prostějov)
Biskupice (Svitavy)
Biskupice (Zlín)
Bítouchov (Mladá Boleslav)
Bítov (Nový Jičín)
Bítov (Znojmo)
Bítovany (Chrudim)
Bítovčice (Jihlava)
Bitozeves (Louny)
Blanné (Znojmo)
Blansko (town; Blansko)
Blatce (Česká Lípa)
Blatec (Olomouc)
Blatná (town; Strakonice)
Blatnice (Plzeň-North)
Blatnice (Třebíč)
Blatnice pod Svatým Antonínkem (Hodonín)
Blatnička (Hodonín)
Blatno (Chomutov)
Blatno (Louny)
Blazice (Kroměříž)
Blažejov (Jindřichův Hradec)
Blažejovice (Benešov)
Blažim (Louny)
Blažim (Plzeň-North)
Blažkov (Žďár nad Sázavou)
Blažovice (Brno-Country)
Blešno (Hradec Králové)
Blevice (Kladno)
Blízkov (Žďár nad Sázavou)
Blížejov (Domažlice)
Blíževedly (Česká Lípa)
Blížkovice (market town; Znojmo)
Blovice (town; Plzeň-South)
Blšany u Loun (Louny)
Blšany (town; Louny)
Blučina (Brno-Country)
Bludov (Kutná Hora)
Bludov (Šumperk)
Bobnice (Nymburk)
Bobrová (market town; Žďár nad Sázavou)
Bobrůvka (Žďár nad Sázavou)
Bocanovice (Frýdek-Místek)
Bochoř (Přerov)
Bochov (town; Karlovy Vary)
Bochovice (Třebíč)
Boháňka (Jičín)
Boharyně (Hradec Králové)
Bohaté Málkovice (Vyškov)
Bohatice (Česká Lípa)
Bohdalec (Žďár nad Sázavou)
Bohdalice-Pavlovice (Vyškov)
Bohdalín (Pelhřimov)
Bohdalov (market town; Žďár nad Sázavou)
Bohdalovice (Český Krumlov)
Bohdaneč (Kutná Hora)
Bohdašín (Rychnov nad Kněžnou)
Bohdíkov (Šumperk)
Bohostice (Příbram)
Bohumilice (Prachatice)
Bohumín (town; Karviná)
Bohunice (Prachatice)
Bohuňov (Svitavy)
Bohuňov (Žďár nad Sázavou)
Bohuňovice (Olomouc)
Bohuňovice (Svitavy)
Bohuslavice (Jihlava)
Bohuslavice (Náchod)
Bohuslavice (Opava)
Bohuslavice (Prostějov)
Bohuslavice (Šumperk)
Bohuslavice nad Vláří (Zlín)
Bohuslavice u Zlína (Zlín)
Bohuslávky (Přerov)
Bohušice (Třebíč)
Bohušov (Bruntál)
Bohušovice nad Ohří (town; Litoměřice)
Bohutice (Znojmo)
Bohutín (Příbram)
Bohutín (Šumperk)
Bohy (Plzeň-North)
Bojanov (market town; Chrudim)
Bojanovice (Prague-West)
Bojanovice (Znojmo)
Bojiště (Havlíčkův Brod)
Bojkovice (town; Uherské Hradiště)
Bolatice (Opava)
Boleboř (Chomutov)
Bolehošť (Rychnov nad Kněžnou)
Boleradice (market town; Břeclav)
Bolešiny (Klatovy)
Bolkov (Plzeň-South)
Boňkov (Havlíčkův Brod)
Bor u Skutče (Chrudim)
Bor (town; Tachov)
Borač (Brno-Country)
Bordovice (Nový Jičín)
Boreč (Mladá Boleslav)
Borek (České Budějovice)
Borek (Havlíčkův Brod)
Borek (Jičín)
Borek (Mělník)
Borek (Pardubice)
Borkovany (Břeclav)
Borkovice (Tábor)
Borohrádek (town; Rychnov nad Kněžnou)
Borotice (Příbram)
Borotice (Znojmo)
Borotín (Blansko)
Borotín (market town; Tábor)
Borová (Náchod)
Borová (Svitavy)
Borová Lada (Prachatice)
Borovany (town; České Budějovice)
Borovany (Písek)
Borovná (Jihlava)
Borovnice (Benešov)
Borovnice (České Budějovice)
Borovnice (Rychnov nad Kněžnou)
Borovnice (Trutnov)
Borovnice (Žďár nad Sázavou)
Borovnička (Trutnov)
Borovník (Brno-Country)
Borovno (Plzeň-South)
Borovy (Klatovy)
Boršice u Blatnice (Uherské Hradiště)
Boršice (Uherské Hradiště)
Boršov nad Vltavou (České Budějovice)
Boršov (Jihlava)
Borušov (Svitavy)
Bory (Žďár nad Sázavou)
Bořanovice (Prague-East)
Bořenovice (Kroměříž)
Bořetice (Břeclav)
Bořetice (Pelhřimov)
Bořetín (Jindřichův Hradec)
Bořetín (Pelhřimov)
Bořice (Chrudim)
Bořislav (Teplice)
Bořitov (Blansko)
Boseň (Mladá Boleslav)
Boskovice (town; Blansko)
Boskovštejn (Znojmo)
Bošice (Prachatice)
Bošilec (České Budějovice)
Bošín (Ústí nad Orlicí)
Bošovice (Vyškov)
Boudy (Písek)
Bousín (Prostějov)
Bousov (Chrudim)
Bouzov (Olomouc)
Bozkov (Semily)
Božanov (Náchod)
Božejov (market town; Pelhřimov)
Božetice (Písek)
Boží Dar (town; Karlovy Vary)
Božice (Znojmo)
Božičany (Karlovy Vary)
Brada-Rybníček (Jičín)
Bradáčov (Tábor)
Bradlec (Mladá Boleslav)
Bradlecká Lhota (Semily)
Brambory (Kutná Hora)
Braňany (Most)
Brandov (Most)
Brandýs nad Labem-Stará Boleslav (town; Prague-East)
Brandýs nad Orlicí (town; Ústí nad Orlicí)
Brandýsek (Kladno)
Branice (Písek)
Braníškov (Brno-Country)
Branišov (České Budějovice)
Branišovice (Brno-Country)
Branka u Opavy (Opava)
Brankovice (market town; Vyškov)
Branky (Vsetín)
Branná (Šumperk)
Branov (Rakovník)
Bransouze (Třebíč)
Brantice (Bruntál)
Branžež (Mladá Boleslav)
Braškov (Kladno)
Břasy (Rokycany)
Bratčice (Brno-Country)
Bratčice (Kutná Hora)
Bratkovice (Příbram)
Bratronice (Kladno)
Bratronice (Strakonice)
Bratrušov (Šumperk)
Bratřejov (Zlín)
Bratřice (Pelhřimov)
Bratříkovice (Opava)
Bratřínov (Prague-West)
Bravantice (Nový Jičín)
Brázdim (Prague-East)
Břeclav (town; Břeclav)
Břehov (České Budějovice)
Břehy (Pardubice)
Břest (Kroměříž)
Břestek (Uherské Hradiště)
Břevnice (Havlíčkův Brod)
Březejc (Žďár nad Sázavou)
Březí (Břeclav)
Březí (Prague-East)
Březí (Strakonice)
Březí (Žďár nad Sázavou)
Březí nad Oslavou (Žďár nad Sázavou)
Březina (Brno-Country, formerly Blansko)
Březina (Brno-Country, formerly Tišnov)
Březina (Jičín)
Březina (Jindřichův Hradec)
Březina (Mladá Boleslav)
Březina (Rokycany)
Březina (Svitavy)
Březinky (Svitavy)
Březiny (Svitavy)
Březnice (town; Příbram)
Březnice (Tábor)
Březnice (Zlín)
Březník (Třebíč)
Březno (Chomutov)
Březno (market town; Mladá Boleslav)
Březolupy (Uherské Hradiště)
Březová-Oleško (Prague-West)
Březová (Beroun)
Březová (Karlovy Vary)
Březová (market town; Opava)
Březová (town; Sokolov)
Březová (Uherské Hradiště)
Březová (Zlín)
Březová nad Svitavou (town; Svitavy)
Březovice (Mladá Boleslav)
Březské (Žďár nad Sázavou)
Březsko (Prostějov)
Březůvky (Zlín)
Břežany (Klatovy)
Břežany (Rakovník)
Břežany (Znojmo)
Břežany I (Kolín)
Břežany II (Kolín)
Břidličná (town; Bruntál)
Bříství (Nymburk)
Bříšťany (Jičín)
Bříza (Litoměřice)
Brloh (Český Krumlov)
Brloh (Pardubice)
Brňany (Litoměřice)
Brněnec (Svitavy)
Brníčko (Šumperk)
Brnířov (Domažlice)
Brniště (Česká Lípa)
Brno (city; Brno-City)
Brod nad Dyjí (Břeclav)
Brod nad Tichou (Tachov)
Brodce (market town; Mladá Boleslav)
Brodec (Louny)
Brodek u Konice (Prostějov)
Brodek u Přerova (market town; Přerov)
Brodek u Prostějova (market town; Prostějov)
Brodeslavy (Plzeň-North)
Broumov (town; Náchod)
Broumov (Tachov)
Broumy (Beroun)
Brozany nad Ohří (market town; Litoměřice)
Brtnice (town; Jihlava)
Brtnička (Třebíč)
Brťov-Jeneč (Blansko)
Brumov (Brno-Country)
Brumov-Bylnice (town; Zlín)
Brumovice (Břeclav)
Brumovice (Opava)
Bruntál (town; Bruntál)
Brusné (Kroměříž)
Brušperk (town; Frýdek-Místek)
Bruzovice (Frýdek-Místek)
Břvany (Louny)
Brzánky (Litoměřice)
Brzice (Náchod)
Brzkov (Jihlava)
Bublava (Sokolov)
Bubovice (Beroun)
Buchlovice (market town; Uherské Hradiště)
Bučí (Plzeň-North)
Bučina (Ústí nad Orlicí)
Bučovice (town; Vyškov)
Budčeves (Jičín)
Budeč (Jindřichův Hradec)
Budeč (Žďár nad Sázavou)
Budětice (Klatovy)
Budětsko (Prostějov)
Budíkov (Pelhřimov)
Budiměřice (Nymburk)
Budislav (Svitavy)
Budislav (Tábor)
Budíškovice (Jindřichův Hradec)
Budišov nad Budišovkou (town; Opava)
Budišov (market town; Třebíč)
Budišovice (Opava)
Budkov (Prachatice)
Budkov (Třebíč)
Budyně nad Ohří (town; Litoměřice)
Budyně (Strakonice)
Bujanov (Český Krumlov)
Bujesily (Rokycany)
Buk (Prachatice)
Buk (Přerov)
Bukov (Žďár nad Sázavou)
Buková (Plzeň-South)
Buková (Prostějov)
Buková u Příbramě (Příbram)
Bukovany (Benešov)
Bukovany (Hodonín)
Bukovany (Olomouc)
Bukovany (Příbram)
Bukovany (Sokolov)
Bukovec (Frýdek-Místek)
Bukovec (Plzeň-South)
Bukovice (Brno-Country)
Bukovice (Náchod)
Bukovina nad Labem (Pardubice)
Bukovina u Čisté (Semily)
Bukovina u Přelouče (Pardubice)
Bukovina (Blansko)
Bukovinka (Blansko)
Bukovka (Pardubice)
Bukovník (Klatovy)
Bukovno (Mladá Boleslav)
Bukvice (Jičín)
Bulhary (Břeclav)
Bulovka (Liberec)
Buřenice (Pelhřimov)
Buš (Prague-West)
Bušanovice (Prachatice)
Bušín (Šumperk)
Bušovice (Rokycany)
Buštěhrad (town; Kladno)
Butoves (Jičín)
Buzice (Strakonice)
Býčkovice (Litoměřice)
Býchory (Kolín)
Býkev (Mělník)
Bykoš (Beroun)
Býkov-Láryšov (Bruntál)
Býkovice (Blansko)
Bylany (Chrudim)
Bynovec (Děčín)
Bystrá nad Jizerou (Semily)
Bystrá (Pelhřimov)
Bystré (Rychnov nad Kněžnou)
Bystré (town; Svitavy)
Bystročice (Olomouc)
Bystrovany (Olomouc)
Bystřany (Teplice)
Bystřec (Ústí nad Orlicí)
Bystřice (town; Benešov)
Bystřice (Frýdek-Místek)
Bystřice (Jičín)
Bystřice nad Pernštejnem (town; Žďár nad Sázavou)
Bystřice pod Hostýnem (town; Kroměříž)
Bystřice pod Lopeníkem (Uherské Hradiště)
Bystřička (Vsetín)
Byšice (Mělník)
Býškovice (Přerov)
Býšovec (Žďár nad Sázavou)
Býšť (Pardubice)
Byzhradec (Rychnov nad Kněžnou)
Bzenec (town; Hodonín)
Bzová (Beroun)
Bžany (Teplice)

C

Čachotín (Havlíčkův Brod)
Čachovice (Mladá Boleslav)
Čachrov (market town; Klatovy)
Čakov (Benešov)
Čakov (České Budějovice)
Čaková (Bruntál)
Čakovičky (Prague-East)
Čankovice (Chrudim)
Čáslav (town; Kutná Hora)
Čáslavice (Třebíč)
Čáslavsko (Pelhřimov)
Částkov (Tachov)
Částkov (Uherské Hradiště)
Častohostice (Třebíč)
Častolovice (market town; Rychnov nad Kněžnou)
Častrov (Pelhřimov)
Časy (Pardubice)
Čavisov (Ostrava-City)
Čebín (Brno-Country)
Cebiv (Tachov)
Čečelice (Mělník)
Čečelovice (Strakonice)
Čechočovice (Třebíč)
Čechtice (market town; Benešov)
Čechtín (Třebíč)
Čechy pod Kosířem (Prostějov)
Čechy (Přerov)
Čečkovice (Havlíčkův Brod)
Čečovice (Plzeň-South)
Cehnice (Strakonice)
Čehovice (Prostějov)
Čejč (Hodonín)
Čejetice (Strakonice)
Čejkovice (České Budějovice)
Čejkovice (Hodonín)
Čejkovice (Kutná Hora)
Čejkovice (Znojmo)
Cejle (Jihlava)
Čejov (Pelhřimov)
Cekov (Rokycany)
Čeladná (Frýdek-Místek)
Čelákovice (town; Prague-East)
Čelčice (Prostějov)
Čelechovice na Hané (Prostějov)
Čelechovice (Přerov)
Čelistná (Pelhřimov)
Čeložnice (Hodonín)
Čeminy (Plzeň-North)
Čenkov u Bechyně (Tábor)
Čenkov (Příbram)
Čenkovice (Ústí nad Orlicí)
Cep (Jindřichův Hradec)
Čeperka (Pardubice)
Čepí (Pardubice)
Čepřovice (Strakonice)
Čeradice (Louny)
Čerčany (Benešov)
Cerekvice nad Bystřicí (Jičín)
Cerekvice nad Loučnou (Svitavy)
Cerekvička-Rosice (Jihlava)
Cerhenice (market town; Kolín)
Cerhonice (Písek)
Cerhovice (market town; Beroun)
Čermákovice (Znojmo)
Čermná (Domažlice)
Čermná (Trutnov)
Čermná nad Orlicí (Rychnov nad Kněžnou)
Čermná ve Slezsku (Opava)
Černá Hora (market town; Blansko)
Černá u Bohdanče (Pardubice)
Černá v Pošumaví (Český Krumlov)
Černá Voda (Jeseník)
Černá (Žďár nad Sázavou)
Černava (Karlovy Vary)
Černčice (Louny)
Černčice (Náchod)
Černé Voděrady (Kolín)
Černěves (Litoměřice)
Černíč (Jihlava)
Černíkov (Domažlice)
Černíkovice (Plzeň-North)
Černíkovice (Rychnov nad Kněžnou)
Černíky (Kolín)
Černilov (Hradec Králové)
Černín (Znojmo)
Černíny (Kutná Hora)
Černiv (Litoměřice)
Černolice (Prague-West)
Černošice (town; Prague-West)
Černošín (town; Tachov)
Černotín (Přerov)
Černouček (Litoměřice)
Černousy (Liberec)
Černov (Pelhřimov)
Černovice (Blansko)
Černovice (Chomutov)
Černovice (town; Pelhřimov)
Černovice (Plzeň-South)
Čerňovice (Plzeň-North)
Černožice (Hradec Králové)
Černuc (Kladno)
Černvír (Brno-Country)
Černý Důl (market town; Trutnov)
Černýšovice (Tábor)
Červená Hora (Náchod)
Červená Lhota (Třebíč)
Červená Řečice (town; Pelhřimov)
Červená Třemešná (Jičín)
Červená Voda (Ústí nad Orlicí)
Červené Janovice (Kutná Hora)
Červené Pečky (market town; Kolín)
Červené Poříčí (Klatovy)
Červenka (Olomouc)
Červený Hrádek (Jindřichův Hradec)
Červený Kostelec (town; Náchod)
Červený Újezd (Benešov)
Červený Újezd (Prague-West)
Česká Bělá (market town; Havlíčkův Brod)
Česká Bříza (Plzeň-North)
Česká Čermná (Náchod)
Česká Kamenice (town; Děčín)
Česká Kubice (Domažlice)
Česká Lípa (town; Česká Lípa)
Česká Metuje (Náchod)
Česká Rybná (Ústí nad Orlicí)
Česká Skalice (town; Náchod)
Česká Třebová (town; Ústí nad Orlicí)
Česká Ves (Jeseník)
Česká (Brno-Country)
České Budějovice (city; České Budějovice)
České Heřmanice (market town; Ústí nad Orlicí)
České Lhotice (Chrudim)
České Libchavy (Ústí nad Orlicí)
České Meziříčí (Rychnov nad Kněžnou)
České Petrovice (Ústí nad Orlicí)
České Velenice (town; Jindřichův Hradec)
Český Brod (town; Kolín)
Český Dub (town; Liberec)
Český Jiřetín (Most)
Český Krumlov (town; Český Krumlov)
Český Rudolec (Jindřichův Hradec)
Český Šternberk (market town; Benešov)
Český Těšín (town; Karviná)
Češov (Jičín)
Čestice (Rychnov nad Kněžnou)
Čestice (market town; Strakonice)
Čestín (Kutná Hora)
Čestlice (Prague-East)
Cetechovice (Kroměříž)
Cetenov (Liberec)
Cetkovice (Blansko)
Cetoraz (Pelhřimov)
Cetyně (Příbram)
Chabařovice (town; Ústí nad Labem)
Chabeřice (Kutná Hora)
Chaloupky (Beroun)
Chanovice (Klatovy)
Charvatce (Mladá Boleslav)
Charváty (Olomouc)
Chářovice (Benešov)
Chbany (Chomutov)
Cheb (town; Cheb)
Chelčice (Strakonice)
Cheznovice (Rokycany)
Chlebičov (Opava)
Chleby (Benešov)
Chleby (Nymburk)
Chleny (Rychnov nad Kněžnou)
Chlístov (Benešov)
Chlístov (Rychnov nad Kněžnou)
Chlístov (Třebíč)
Chlistov (Klatovy)
Chlístovice (Kutná Hora)
Chlum-Korouhvice (Žďár nad Sázavou)
Chlum (Benešov)
Chlum (Česká Lípa)
Chlum (Plzeň-South)
Chlum (Rokycany)
Chlum (Strakonice)
Chlum (Třebíč)
Chlum Svaté Maří (Sokolov)
Chlum u Třeboně (market town; Jindřichův Hradec)
Chlumany (Prachatice)
Chlumčany (Louny)
Chlumčany (Plzeň-South)
Chlumec (Český Krumlov)
Chlumec (town; Ústí nad Labem)
Chlumec nad Cidlinou (town; Hradec Králové)
Chlumek (Žďár nad Sázavou)
Chlumětín (Žďár nad Sázavou)
Chlumín (Mělník)
Chlumy (Plzeň-South)
Chlustina (Beroun)
Chmelík (Svitavy)
Chmelná (Benešov)
Chobot (Strakonice)
Choceň (town; Ústí nad Orlicí)
Chocenice (Plzeň-South)
Chocerady (Benešov)
Chocnějovice (Mladá Boleslav)
Chocomyšl (Domažlice)
Chodouň (Beroun)
Chodouny (Litoměřice)
Chodov (Domažlice)
Chodov (Karlovy Vary)
Chodov (town; Sokolov)
Chodová Planá (market town; Tachov)
Chodovlice (Litoměřice)
Chodská Lhota (Domažlice)
Chodský Újezd (Tachov)
Cholenice (Jičín)
Cholina (Olomouc)
Choltice (market town; Pardubice)
Chomle (Rokycany)
Chomutice (Jičín)
Chomutov (city; Chomutov)
Chomýž (Kroměříž)
Choratice (Benešov)
Chornice (Svitavy)
Chorušice (Mělník)
Choryně (Vsetín)
Choťánky (Nymburk)
Chotěboř (town; Havlíčkův Brod)
Chotěbudice (Třebíč)
Chotěbuz (Karviná)
Choteč (Jičín)
Choteč (Pardubice)
Choteč (Prague-West)
Chotěmice (Tábor)
Chotěnov (Svitavy)
Chotěšice (Nymburk)
Chotěšov (Litoměřice)
Chotěšov (Plzeň-South)
Chotětov (market town; Mladá Boleslav)
Chotěvice (Trutnov)
Chotíkov (Plzeň-North)
Chotilsko (Příbram)
Chotiměř (Litoměřice)
Chotiněves (Litoměřice)
Chotovice (Česká Lípa)
Chotovice (Svitavy)
Choťovice (Nymburk)
Chotoviny (Tábor)
Chotusice (Kutná Hora)
Chotutice (Kolín)
Chotýčany (České Budějovice)
Chotyně (Liberec)
Chotýšany (Benešov)
Choustník (Tábor)
Choustníkovo Hradiště (market town; Trutnov)
Chožov (Louny)
Chraberce (Louny)
Chrast (town; Chrudim)
Chrást (Nymburk)
Chrást (Plzeň-City)
Chrást (Příbram)
Chrastava (town; Liberec)
Chrastavec (Svitavy)
Chrastavice (Domažlice)
Chrášťany (Benešov)
Chrášťany (České Budějovice)
Chrášťany (Kolín)
Chrášťany (Prague-West)
Chrášťany (Rakovník)
Chraštice (Příbram)
Chrášťovice (Strakonice)
Chrbonín (Tábor)
Chřenovice (Havlíčkův Brod)
Chřibská (town; Děčín)
Chříč (Plzeň-North)
Chroboly (Prachatice)
Chromeč (Šumperk)
Chropyně (town; Kroměříž)
Chroustov (Nymburk)
Chroustovice (market town; Chrudim)
Chrtníč (Havlíčkův Brod)
Chrtníky (Pardubice)
Chrudichromy (Blansko)
Chrudim (town; Chrudim)
Chrustenice (Beroun)
Chržín (Kladno)
Chudčice (Brno-Country)
Chudenice (market town; Klatovy)
Chudenín (Klatovy)
Chuderov (Ústí nad Labem)
Chudeřice (Hradec Králové)
Chudíř (Mladá Boleslav)
Chudoslavice (Litoměřice)
Chuchelná (Opava)
Chuchelna (Semily)
Chvalatice (Znojmo)
Chvalčov (Kroměříž)
Chvaleč (Trutnov)
Chválenice (Plzeň-City)
Chvaletice (town; Pardubice)
Chvalíkovice (Opava)
Chvalkovice (Náchod)
Chvalkovice (Vyškov)
Chvalnov-Lísky (Kroměříž)
Chvalovice (Prachatice)
Chvalovice (Znojmo)
Chvalšiny (Český Krumlov)
Chvatěruby (Mělník)
Chvojenec (Pardubice)
Chyjice (Jičín)
Chyňava (Beroun)
Chýně (Prague-West)
Chýnice (Prague-West)
Chýnov (town; Tábor)
Chýstovice (Pelhřimov)
Chyše (town; Karlovy Vary)
Chyšky (Písek)
Chyšná (Pelhřimov)
Chýšť (Pardubice)
Číčenice (Strakonice)
Čichalov (Karlovy Vary)
Číchov (Třebíč)
Číčovice (Prague-West)
Cidlina (Třebíč)
Číhalín (Třebíč)
Číhaň (Klatovy)
Číhošť (Havlíčkův Brod)
Cikháj (Žďár nad Sázavou)
Čikov (Třebíč)
Čilá (Rokycany)
Čilec (Nymburk)
Čím (Příbram)
Čimelice (Písek)
Číměř (Jindřichův Hradec)
Číměř (Třebíč)
Čímice (Klatovy)
Činěves (Nymburk)
Církvice (Kolín)
Církvice (Kutná Hora)
Císařov (Přerov)
Čisovice (Prague-West)
Čistá (Mladá Boleslav)
Čistá (Rakovník)
Čistá (Svitavy)
Čistá u Horek (Semily)
Čistěves (Hradec Králové)
Citice (Sokolov)
Cítoliby (market town; Louny)
Citonice (Znojmo)
Cítov (Mělník)
Citov (Přerov)
Čižice (Plzeň-South)
Čížkov (Pelhřimov)
Čížkov (Plzeň-South)
Čížkovice (Litoměřice)
Čížkrajice (České Budějovice)
Cizkrajov (Jindřichův Hradec)
Čížov (Jihlava)
Čížová (Písek)
Čkyně (Prachatice)
Člunek (Jindřichův Hradec)
Čmelíny (Plzeň-South)
Cotkytle (Ústí nad Orlicí)
Crhov (Blansko)
Ctětín (Chrudim)
Ctiboř (Benešov)
Ctiboř (Tachov)
Ctidružice (Znojmo)
Ctiměřice (Mladá Boleslav)
Ctiněves (Litoměřice)
Čtveřín (Liberec)
Čtyřkoly (Benešov)
Čučice (Brno-Country)
Cvikov (town; Česká Lípa)
Cvrčovice (Brno-Country)
Cvrčovice (Kladno)

D

Dačice (town; Jindřichův Hradec)
Dalečín (Žďár nad Sázavou)
Daleké Dušníky (Příbram)
Dalešice (Jablonec nad Nisou)
Dalešice (market town; Třebíč)
Dalovice (Karlovy Vary)
Dalovice (Mladá Boleslav)
Dambořice (Hodonín)
Damnice (Znojmo)
Damníkov (Ústí nad Orlicí)
Daňkovice (Žďár nad Sázavou)
Darkovice (Opava)
Daskabát (Olomouc)
Dasnice (Sokolov)
Dasný (České Budějovice)
Dašice (town; Pardubice)
Davle (market town; Prague-West)
Deblín (market town; Brno-Country)
Děčany (Litoměřice)
Děčín (city; Děčín)
Dědice (Třebíč)
Dědová (Chrudim)
Dehtáře (Pelhřimov)
Děhylov (Opava)
Děkanovice (Benešov)
Děkov (Rakovník)
Děpoltovice (Karlovy Vary)
Dešenice (market town; Klatovy)
Desná (town; Jablonec nad Nisou)
Dešná (Jindřichův Hradec)
Desná (Svitavy)
Dešná (Zlín)
Dešov (Třebíč)
Deštná (Blansko)
Deštná (town; Jindřichův Hradec)
Deštné v Orlických horách (Rychnov nad Kněžnou)
Deštnice (Louny)
Dětenice (Jičín)
Dětkovice (Prostějov)
Dětkovice (Vyškov)
Dětmarovice (Karviná)
Dětřichov (Liberec)
Dětřichov (Svitavy)
Dětřichov nad Bystřicí (Bruntál)
Dětřichov u Moravské Třebové (Svitavy)
Dílce (Jičín)
Díly (Domažlice)
Dírná (Tábor)
Diváky (Břeclav)
Dívčí Hrad (Bruntál)
Dívčí Kopy (Jindřichův Hradec)
Dívčice (České Budějovice)
Divec (Hradec Králové)
Divišov (market town; Benešov)
Dlažkovice (Litoměřice)
Dlažov (Klatovy)
Dlouhá Brtnice (Jihlava)
Dlouhá Lhota (Blansko)
Dlouhá Lhota (Mladá Boleslav)
Dlouhá Lhota (Příbram)
Dlouhá Lhota (Tábor)
Dlouhá Loučka (Olomouc)
Dlouhá Loučka (Svitavy)
Dlouhá Stráň (Bruntál)
Dlouhá Třebová (Ústí nad Orlicí)
Dlouhá Ves (Havlíčkův Brod)
Dlouhá Ves (Klatovy)
Dlouhé (Žďár nad Sázavou)
Dlouhomilov (Šumperk)
Dlouhoňovice (Ústí nad Orlicí)
Dlouhopolsko (Nymburk)
Dlouhý Most (Liberec)
Dlouhý Újezd (Tachov)
Dnešice (Plzeň-South)
Dobelice (Znojmo)
Dobev (Písek)
Dobkovice (Děčín)
Dobrá Voda (Pelhřimov)
Dobrá Voda (Žďár nad Sázavou)
Dobrá Voda u Českých Budějovic (České Budějovice)
Dobrá Voda u Hořic (Jičín)
Dobrá Voda u Pacova (Pelhřimov)
Dobrá (Frýdek-Místek)
Dobřany (town; Plzeň-South)
Dobřany (Rychnov nad Kněžnou)
Dobratice (Frýdek-Místek)
Dobrčice (Přerov)
Dobré Pole (Břeclav)
Dobré (Rychnov nad Kněžnou)
Dobřejovice (Prague-East)
Dobřeň (Mělník)
Dobřenice (Hradec Králové)
Dobříč (Plzeň-North)
Dobříč (Prague-West)
Dobřichov (Kolín)
Dobřichovice (town; Prague-West)
Dobříkov (Ústí nad Orlicí)
Dobříň (Litoměřice)
Dobřínsko (Znojmo)
Dobříš (town; Příbram)
Dobřív (Rokycany)
Dobrkovice (Zlín)
Dobrná (Děčín)
Dobročkovice (Vyškov)
Dobročovice (Prague-East)
Dobrohošť (Jindřichův Hradec)
Dobrochov (Prostějov)
Dobroměřice (Louny)
Dobromilice (Prostějov)
Dobronice u Bechyně (Tábor)
Dobronín (Jihlava)
Dobroslavice (Opava)
Dobroutov (Jihlava)
Dobrovice (town; Mladá Boleslav)
Dobrovítov (Kutná Hora)
Dobrovíz (Prague-West)
Dobršín (Klatovy)
Dobruška (town; Rychnov nad Kněžnou)
Dobšice (České Budějovice)
Dobšice (Nymburk)
Dobšice (Znojmo)
Dobšín (Mladá Boleslav)
Dohalice (Hradec Králové)
Doksany (Litoměřice)
Doksy (town; Česká Lípa)
Doksy (Kladno)
Dolánky nad Ohří (Litoměřice)
Dolany (Kladno)
Dolany (Klatovy)
Dolany (Náchod)
Dolany (Olomouc)
Dolany (Pardubice)
Dolany (Plzeň-North)
Dolany nad Vltavou (Prague-West)
Dolce (Plzeň-South)
Dolenice (Znojmo)
Dolní Bečva (Vsetín)
Dolní Bělá (Plzeň-North)
Dolní Benešov (town; Opava)
Dolní Beřkovice (Mělník)
Dolní Bezděkov (Chrudim)
Dolní Bojanovice (Hodonín)
Dolní Bousov (town; Mladá Boleslav)
Dolní Branná (Trutnov)
Dolní Břežany (Prague-West)
Dolní Brusnice (Trutnov)
Dolní Bukovsko (market town; České Budějovice)
Dolní Cerekev (market town; Jihlava)
Dolní Čermná (market town; Ústí nad Orlicí)
Dolní Chvatliny (Kolín)
Dolní Dobrouč (Ústí nad Orlicí)
Dolní Domaslavice (Frýdek-Místek)
Dolní Dubňany (Znojmo)
Dolní Dunajovice (Břeclav)
Dolní Dvořiště (Český Krumlov)
Dolní Dvůr (Trutnov)
Dolní Habartice (Děčín)
Dolní Hbity (Příbram)
Dolní Heřmanice (Žďár nad Sázavou)
Dolní Hořice (Tábor)
Dolní Hradiště (Plzeň-North)
Dolní Hrachovice (Tábor)
Dolní Kalná (Trutnov)
Dolní Kounice (town; Brno-Country)
Dolní Kralovice (Benešov)
Dolní Krupá (Havlíčkův Brod)
Dolní Krupá (Mladá Boleslav)
Dolní Lánov (Trutnov)
Dolní Lažany (Třebíč)
Dolní Lhota (Ostrava-City)
Dolní Lhota (Zlín)
Dolní Libochová (Žďár nad Sázavou)
Dolní Lochov (Jičín)
Dolní Lomná (Frýdek-Místek)
Dolní Loučky (Brno-Country)
Dolní Lukavice (Plzeň-South)
Dolní Lutyně (Karviná)
Dolní Město (Havlíčkův Brod)
Dolní Morava (Ústí nad Orlicí)
Dolní Moravice (Bruntál)
Dolní Němčí (Uherské Hradiště)
Dolní Nětčice (Přerov)
Dolní Nivy (Sokolov)
Dolní Novosedly (Písek)
Dolní Olešnice (Trutnov)
Dolní Pěna (Jindřichův Hradec)
Dolní Podluží (Děčín)
Dolní Pohleď (Kutná Hora)
Dolní Poustevna (town; Děčín)
Dolní Přím (Hradec Králové)
Dolní Radechová (Náchod)
Dolní Řasnice (Liberec)
Dolní Ředice (Pardubice)
Dolní Roveň (Pardubice)
Dolní Rožínka (Žďár nad Sázavou)
Dolní Rychnov (Sokolov)
Dolní Slivno (Mladá Boleslav)
Dolní Sokolovec (Havlíčkův Brod)
Dolní Stakory (Mladá Boleslav)
Dolní Studénky (Šumperk)
Dolní Těšice (Přerov)
Dolní Tošanovice (Frýdek-Místek)
Dolní Třebonín (Český Krumlov)
Dolní Újezd (Přerov)
Dolní Újezd (Svitavy)
Dolní Věstonice (Břeclav)
Dolní Vilémovice (Třebíč)
Dolní Vilímeč (Jihlava)
Dolní Zálezly (Ústí nad Labem)
Dolní Žandov (Cheb)
Dolní Žďár (Jindřichův Hradec)
Dolní Zimoř (Mělník)
Dolní Životice (Opava)
Doloplazy (Olomouc)
Doloplazy (Prostějov)
Domamil (Třebíč)
Domanín (Hodonín)
Domanín (Jindřichův Hradec)
Dománovice (Kolín)
Domašín (Chomutov)
Domašov nad Bystřicí (Olomouc)
Domašov u Šternberka (Olomouc)
Domašov (Brno-Country)
Domaželice (Přerov)
Domažlice (town; Domažlice)
Domoraz (Klatovy)
Domousnice (Mladá Boleslav)
Domoušice (Louny)
Doňov (Jindřichův Hradec)
Doubek (Prague-East)
Doubice (Děčín)
Doubrava (Karviná)
Doubravčice (Kolín)
Doubravice (České Budějovice)
Doubravice (Strakonice)
Doubravice (Trutnov)
Doubravice nad Svitavou (market town; Blansko)
Doubravička (Mladá Boleslav)
Doubravník (market town; Brno-Country)
Doubravy (Zlín)
Doudleby nad Orlicí (market town; Rychnov nad Kněžnou)
Doudleby (České Budějovice)
Doupě (Jihlava)
Drachkov (Strakonice)
Dráchov (Tábor)
Drahanovice (Olomouc)
Drahany (market town; Prostějov)
Drahelčice (Prague-West)
Drahenice (Příbram)
Drahkov (Plzeň-South)
Drahlín (Příbram)
Drahňovice (Benešov)
Drahobudice (Kolín)
Drahobuz (Litoměřice)
Drahonice (Strakonice)
Drahonín (Brno-Country)
Drahoňův Újezd (Rokycany)
Drahotěšice (České Budějovice)
Drahotín (Domažlice)
Drahouš (Rakovník)
Drahov (Tábor)
Drásov (market town; Brno-Country)
Drásov (Příbram)
Dražeň (Plzeň-North)
Draženov (Domažlice)
Dražice (Tábor)
Dražíč (Písek)
Dražičky (Tábor)
Drážov (Strakonice)
Dražovice (Klatovy)
Dražovice (Vyškov)
Dražůvky (Hodonín)
Dřenice (Chrudim)
Dřešín (Strakonice)
Dřetovice (Kladno)
Dřevčice (Prague-East)
Dřevěnice (Jičín)
Drevníky (Příbram)
Dřevnovice (Prostějov)
Dřevohostice (market town; Přerov)
Drhovice (Tábor)
Drhovle (Písek)
Drhovy (Příbram)
Dřínov (Kladno)
Dřínov (Kroměříž)
Dřínov (Mělník)
Dřísy (Mělník)
Dříteč (Pardubice)
Dříteň (České Budějovice)
Drmoul (Cheb)
Drnek (Kladno)
Drnholec (market town; Břeclav)
Drnovice (Blansko)
Drnovice (Vyškov)
Drnovice (Zlín)
Drobovice (Kutná Hora)
Droužetice (Strakonice)
Droužkovice (Chomutov)
Drozdov (Beroun)
Drozdov (Šumperk)
Drslavice (Prachatice)
Drslavice (Uherské Hradiště)
Druhanov (Havlíčkův Brod)
Drunče (Jindřichův Hradec)
Druztová (Plzeň-North)
Družec (Kladno)
Drysice (Vyškov)
Držkov (Jablonec nad Nisou)
Držková (Zlín)
Dub (market town; Prachatice)
Dub nad Moravou (market town; Olomouc)
Dubá (town; Česká Lípa)
Dubany (Pardubice)
Dubčany (Olomouc)
Dubenec (Příbram)
Dubenec (Trutnov)
Dubí (town; Teplice)
Dubicko (Šumperk)
Dubičné (České Budějovice)
Dublovice (Příbram)
Dubňany (town; Hodonín)
Dubné (České Budějovice)
Dubnice (Česká Lípa)
Dubno (Příbram)
Dubovice (Pelhřimov)
Duchcov (town; Teplice)
Dudín (Jihlava)
Dukovany (Třebíč)
Důl (Pelhřimov)
Dunajovice (Jindřichův Hradec)
Dunice (Benešov)
Dušejov (Jihlava)
Dušníky (Litoměřice)
Dvakačovice (Chrudim)
Dvorce (Bruntál)
Dvorce (Jihlava)
Dvory (Nymburk)
Dvory (Prachatice)
Dvory nad Lužnicí (Jindřichův Hradec)
Dvůr Králové nad Labem (town; Trutnov)
Dyjákovice (Znojmo)
Dyjákovičky (Znojmo)
Dyje (Znojmo)
Dyjice (Jihlava)
Dymokury (Nymburk)
Dynín (České Budějovice)
Dýšina (Plzeň-City)
Džbánice (Znojmo)
Džbánov (Ústí nad Orlicí)
Dzbel (Prostějov)

E

Ejpovice (Rokycany)
Erpužice (Tachov)
Eš (Pelhřimov)
Evaň (Litoměřice)

F

Felbabka (Beroun)
Frahelž (Jindřichův Hradec)
Francova Lhota (Vsetín)
Františkov nad Ploučnicí (Děčín)
Františkovy Lázně (town; Cheb)
Frenštát pod Radhoštěm (town; Nový Jičín)
Fryčovice (Frýdek-Místek)
Frýdek-Místek (city; Frýdek-Místek)
Frýdlant (town; Liberec)
Frýdlant nad Ostravicí (town; Frýdek-Místek)
Frýdštejn (Jablonec nad Nisou)
Frymburk (market town; Český Krumlov)
Frymburk (Klatovy)
Fryšava pod Žákovou horou (Žďár nad Sázavou)
Fryšták (town; Zlín)
Fulnek (town; Nový Jičín)

G

Golčův Jeníkov (town; Havlíčkův Brod)
Grešlové Mýto (Znojmo)
Gruna (Svitavy)
Grunta (Kolín)
Grygov (Olomouc)
Grymov (Přerov)

H

Habartice (Liberec)
Habartov (town; Sokolov)
Habrovany (Ústí nad Labem)
Habrovany (Vyškov)
Habrůvka (Blansko)
Habry (town; Havlíčkův Brod)
Habří (České Budějovice)
Habřina (Hradec Králové)
Hačky (Prostějov)
Hadravova Rosička (Jindřichův Hradec)
Háj u Duchcova (Teplice)
Háj ve Slezsku (Opava)
Hajany (Brno-Country)
Hajany (Strakonice)
Háje nad Jizerou (Semily)
Háje (Příbram)
Hájek (Karlovy Vary)
Hájek (Strakonice)
Hajnice (Trutnov)
Halámky (Jindřichův Hradec)
Halenkov (Vsetín)
Halenkovice (Zlín)
Haluzice (Zlín)
Halže (Tachov)
Hamr (Jindřichův Hradec)
Hamr na Jezeře (Česká Lípa)
Hamry (Chrudim)
Hamry (Klatovy)
Hamry nad Sázavou (Žďár nad Sázavou)
Haňovice (Olomouc)
Hanušovice (town; Šumperk)
Harrachov (town; Jablonec nad Nisou)
Hartinkov (Svitavy)
Hartmanice (České Budějovice)
Hartmanice (town; Klatovy)
Hartmanice (Svitavy)
Hartvíkovice (Třebíč)
Haškovcova Lhota (Tábor)
Hať (Opava)
Hatín (Jindřichův Hradec)
Havířov (city; Karviná)
Havlíčkova Borová (market town; Havlíčkův Brod)
Havlíčkův Brod (town; Havlíčkův Brod)
Havlovice (Trutnov)
Havraň (Most)
Havraníky (Znojmo)
Hazlov (Cheb)
Hejná (Klatovy)
Hejnice (town; Liberec)
Hejnice (Ústí nad Orlicí)
Hejtmánkovice (Náchod)
Helvíkovice (Ústí nad Orlicí)
Herálec (Havlíčkův Brod)
Herálec (Žďár nad Sázavou)
Heraltice (market town; Třebíč)
Herink (Prague-East)
Heroltice (Brno-Country)
Heršpice (Vyškov)
Heřmaň (České Budějovice)
Heřmaň (Písek)
Heřmaneč (Jindřichův Hradec)
Heřmanice (Havlíčkův Brod)
Heřmanice (Liberec)
Heřmanice (Náchod)
Heřmanice u Oder (Nový Jičín)
Heřmaničky (Benešov)
Heřmánkovice (Náchod)
Heřmánky (Nový Jičín)
Heřmanov (Děčín)
Heřmanov (Žďár nad Sázavou)
Heřmanova Huť (Plzeň-North)
Heřmanovice (Bruntál)
Heřmanův Městec (town; Chrudim)
Hevlín (Znojmo)
Hladké Životice (Nový Jičín)
Hladov (Jihlava)
Hlasivo (Tábor)
Hlásná Třebaň (Beroun)
Hlásnice (Olomouc)
Hlavatce (České Budějovice)
Hlavatce (Tábor)
Hlavečník (Pardubice)
Hlavenec (Mladá Boleslav)
Hlavice (Liberec)
Hlavnice (Opava)
Hlavňovice (Klatovy)
Hlína (Brno-Country)
Hlince (Plzeň-North)
Hlincová Hora (České Budějovice)
Hlinka (Bruntál)
Hlinná (Litoměřice)
Hlinsko (town; Chrudim)
Hlinsko (Přerov)
Hlízov (Kutná Hora)
Hlohová (Domažlice)
Hlohovčice (Domažlice)
Hlohovec (Břeclav)
Hlohovice (Rokycany)
Hlubočany (Vyškov)
Hlubočec (Opava)
Hlubočky (Olomouc)
Hluboká (Chrudim)
Hluboká nad Vltavou (town; České Budějovice)
Hluboké Dvory (Brno-Country)
Hluboké Mašůvky (Znojmo)
Hluboké (Třebíč)
Hluboš (Příbram)
Hlubyně (Příbram)
Hluchov (Prostějov)
Hlučín (town; Opava)
Hluk (town; Uherské Hradiště)
Hlupín (Strakonice)
Hlušice (Hradec Králové)
Hlušovice (Olomouc)
Hnačov (Klatovy)
Hnanice (Znojmo)
Hnátnice (Ústí nad Orlicí)
Hněvčeves (Hradec Králové)
Hněvkovice (Havlíčkův Brod)
Hněvnice (Plzeň-North)
Hněvošice (Opava)
Hněvotín (Olomouc)
Hnojice (Olomouc)
Hnojník (Frýdek-Místek)
Hobšovice (Kladno)
Hodějice (Vyškov)
Hodětín (Tábor)
Hodice (Jihlava)
Hodíškov (Žďár nad Sázavou)
Hodkovice nad Mohelkou (town; Liberec)
Hodonice (Tábor)
Hodonice (Znojmo)
Hodonín (Blansko)
Hodonín (Chrudim)
Hodonín (town; Hodonín)
Hodov (Třebíč)
Hodslavice (Nový Jičín)
Hojanovice (Pelhřimov)
Hojkov (Jihlava)
Hojovice (Pelhřimov)
Holany (market town; Česká Lípa)
Holasice (Brno-Country)
Holasovice (Opava)
Holčovice (Bruntál)
Holedeč (Louny)
Holenice (Semily)
Holešov (town; Kroměříž)
Holetín (Chrudim)
Holice (town; Pardubice)
Holín (Jičín)
Holohlavy (Hradec Králové)
Holotín (Pardubice)
Holoubkov (Rokycany)
Holovousy (Jičín)
Holovousy (Plzeň-North)
Holštejn (Blansko)
Holubice (Prague-West)
Holubice (Vyškov)
Holubov (Český Krumlov)
Holýšov (town; Plzeň-South)
Homole (České Budějovice)
Homole u Panny (Ústí nad Labem)
Honbice (Chrudim)
Honětice (Kroměříž)
Honezovice (Plzeň-South)
Hora Svaté Kateřiny (town; Most)
Hora Svatého Šebestiána (Chomutov)
Hora Svatého Václava (Domažlice)
Hořany (Nymburk)
Hořátev (Nymburk)
Horažďovice (town; Klatovy)
Horčápsko (Příbram)
Hořenice (Náchod)
Hořepník (Pelhřimov)
Hořesedly (Rakovník)
Hořešovice (Kladno)
Hořešovičky (Kladno)
Hořice (town; Jičín)
Hořice (Pelhřimov)
Hořice na Šumavě (market town; Český Krumlov)
Hořičky (Náchod)
Hořín (Mělník)
Hořiněves (Hradec Králové)
Horka I (Kutná Hora)
Horka II (Kutná Hora)
Horka nad Moravou (Olomouc)
Horka u Staré Paky (Semily)
Horka (Chrudim)
Horky (Kutná Hora)
Horky (Svitavy)
Horky nad Jizerou (Mladá Boleslav)
Horní Bečva (Vsetín)
Horní Bělá (Plzeň-North)
Horní Benešov (town; Bruntál)
Horní Beřkovice (Litoměřice)
Horní Bezděkov (Kladno)
Horní Blatná (town; Karlovy Vary)
Horní Bludovice (Frýdek-Místek)
Horní Bojanovice (Břeclav)
Horní Bradlo (Chrudim)
Horní Branná (Semily)
Horní Břečkov (Znojmo)
Horní Bříza (town; Plzeň-North)
Horní Brusnice (Trutnov)
Horní Bukovina (Mladá Boleslav)
Horní Cerekev (town; Pelhřimov)
Horní Čermná (Ústí nad Orlicí)
Horní Domaslavice (Frýdek-Místek)
Horní Dubenky (Jihlava)
Horní Dubňany (Znojmo)
Horní Dunajovice (Znojmo)
Horní Dvořiště (Český Krumlov)
Horní Habartice (Děčín)
Horní Heřmanice (Třebíč)
Horní Heřmanice (Ústí nad Orlicí)
Horní Jelení (town; Pardubice)
Horní Jiřetín (town; Most)
Horní Kalná (Trutnov)
Horní Kamenice (Plzeň-South)
Horní Kněžeklady (České Budějovice)
Horní Kounice (Znojmo)
Horní Kozolupy (Tachov)
Horní Krupá (Havlíčkův Brod)
Horní Kruty (Kolín)
Horní Lapač (Kroměříž)
Horní Lhota (Ostrava-City)
Horní Lhota (Zlín)
Horní Libchava (Česká Lípa)
Horní Libochová (Žďár nad Sázavou)
Horní Lideč (Vsetín)
Horní Loděnice (Olomouc)
Horní Lomná (Frýdek-Místek)
Horní Loučky (Brno-Country)
Horní Lukavice (Plzeň-South)
Horní Maršov (Trutnov)
Horní Město (Bruntál)
Horní Meziříčko (Jindřichův Hradec)
Horní Moštěnice (Přerov)
Horní Myslová (Jihlava)
Horní Němčí (Uherské Hradiště)
Horní Němčice (Jindřichův Hradec)
Horní Nětčice (Přerov)
Horní Olešnice (Trutnov)
Horní Paseka (Havlíčkův Brod)
Horní Pěna (Jindřichův Hradec)
Horní Planá (town; Český Krumlov)
Horní Počaply (Mělník)
Horní Podluží (Děčín)
Horní Police (Česká Lípa)
Horní Poříčí (Blansko)
Horní Poříčí (Strakonice)
Horní Radechová (Náchod)
Horní Radouň (Jindřichův Hradec)
Horní Radslavice (Žďár nad Sázavou)
Horní Rápotice (Pelhřimov)
Horní Řasnice (Liberec)
Horní Ředice (Pardubice)
Horní Řepčice (Litoměřice)
Horní Rožínka (Žďár nad Sázavou)
Horní Skrýchov (Jindřichův Hradec)
Horní Slatina (Jindřichův Hradec)
Horní Slavkov (town; Sokolov)
Horní Slivno (Mladá Boleslav)
Horní Smrčné (Třebíč)
Horní Smržov (Blansko)
Horní Stropnice (České Budějovice)
Horní Studénky (Šumperk)
Horní Suchá (Karviná)
Horní Štěpánov (Prostějov)
Horní Těšice (Přerov)
Horní Tošanovice (Frýdek-Místek)
Horní Třešňovec (Ústí nad Orlicí)
Horní Újezd (Přerov)
Horní Újezd (Svitavy)
Horní Újezd (Třebíč)
Horní Ves (Pelhřimov)
Horní Věstonice (Břeclav)
Horní Vilémovice (Třebíč)
Horní Vltavice (Prachatice)
Horní Životice (Bruntál)
Hornice (Třebíč)
Hornosín (Strakonice)
Horoměřice (Prague-West)
Horosedly (Písek)
Horoušany (Prague-East)
Hořovice (town; Beroun)
Hořovičky (Rakovník)
Horská Kvilda (Klatovy)
Horšice (Plzeň-South)
Horšovský Týn (town; Domažlice)
Horušice (Kutná Hora)
Hory (Karlovy Vary)
Hosín (České Budějovice)
Hoslovice (Strakonice)
Hospozín (Kladno)
Hospříz (Jindřichův Hradec)
Hošťálková (Vsetín)
Hošťálkovy (Bruntál)
Hošťalovice (Chrudim)
Hostašovice (Nový Jičín)
Hoštejn (Šumperk)
Hostějov (Uherské Hradiště)
Hostěnice (Brno-Country)
Hostěradice (Znojmo)
Hostěrádky-Rešov (Vyškov)
Hostětice (Jihlava)
Hostětín (Uherské Hradiště)
Hoštice (Kroměříž)
Hoštice (Strakonice)
Hoštice-Heroltice (Vyškov)
Hostim (Znojmo)
Hostín u Vojkovic (Mělník)
Hostín (Mělník)
Hostinné (town; Trutnov)
Hostišová (Zlín)
Hostivice (town; Prague-West)
Hoštka (town; Litoměřice)
Hošťka (Tachov)
Hostomice (town; Beroun)
Hostomice (market town; Teplice)
Hostouň (town; Domažlice)
Hostouň (Kladno)
Hostovlice (Kutná Hora)
Hosty (České Budějovice)
Hovězí (Vsetín)
Hovorany (Hodonín)
Hovorčovice (Prague-East)
Hraběšice (Šumperk)
Hraběšín (Kutná Hora)
Hrabětice (Znojmo)
Hrabišín (Šumperk)
Hrabová (Šumperk)
Hrabůvka (Přerov)
Hrabyně (Opava)
Hradce (České Budějovice)
Hradčany-Kobeřice (Prostějov)
Hradčany (Brno-Country)
Hradčany (Nymburk)
Hradčany (Přerov)
Hradčovice (Uherské Hradiště)
Hradec-Nová Ves (Jeseník)
Hradec (Havlíčkův Brod)
Hradec (Plzeň-South)
Hradec Králové (city; Hradec Králové)
Hradec nad Moravicí (town; Opava)
Hradec nad Svitavou (Svitavy)
Hradečno (Kladno)
Hrádek (Frýdek-Místek)
Hrádek (Hradec Králové)
Hrádek (Klatovy)
Hrádek (town; Rokycany)
Hrádek (Ústí nad Orlicí)
Hrádek (Znojmo)
Hrádek nad Nisou (town; Liberec)
Hradešice (Klatovy)
Hradešín (Kolín)
Hradiště (Benešov)
Hradiště (Domažlice)
Hradiště (Plzeň-South)
Hradiště (Rokycany)
Hradištko (Nymburk)
Hradištko (Prague-West)
Hracholusky (Prachatice)
Hracholusky (Rakovník)
Hrachoviště (Jindřichův Hradec)
Hranice (České Budějovice)
Hranice (town; Cheb)
Hranice (town; Přerov)
Hraničné Petrovice (Olomouc)
Hrazany (Písek)
Hrčava (Frýdek-Místek)
Hrdějovice (České Budějovice)
Hrdibořice (Prostějov)
Hrdlív (Kladno)
Hrdlořezy (Mladá Boleslav)
Hřebeč (Kladno)
Hřebečníky (Rakovník)
Hředle (Beroun)
Hředle (Rakovník)
Hrejkovice (Písek)
Hřensko (Děčín)
Hřibiny-Ledská (Rychnov nad Kněžnou)
Hřibojedy (Trutnov)
Hřiměždice (Příbram)
Hříšice (Jindřichův Hradec)
Hříškov (Louny)
Hřivice (Louny)
Hřivínův Újezd (Zlín)
Hrob (town; Teplice)
Hrobce (Litoměřice)
Hrobčice (Teplice)
Hrobice (Pardubice)
Hrobice (Zlín)
Hrochův Týnec (town; Chrudim)
Hromnice (Plzeň-North)
Hronov (town; Náchod)
Hrotovice (town; Třebíč)
Hroubovice (Chrudim)
Hroznatín (Třebíč)
Hroznětín (town; Karlovy Vary)
Hroznová Lhota (Hodonín)
Hrubá Skála (Semily)
Hrubá Vrbka (Hodonín)
Hrubčice (Prostějov)
Hrubý Jeseník (Nymburk)
Hrusice (Prague-East)
Hruška (Prostějov)
Hrušky (Břeclav)
Hrušky (Vyškov)
Hrušov (Mladá Boleslav)
Hrušová (Ústí nad Orlicí)
Hrušovany nad Jevišovkou (town; Znojmo)
Hrušovany u Brna (Brno-Country)
Hrušovany (Chomutov)
Hrutov (Třebíč)
Hubenov (Jihlava)
Hudčice (Příbram)
Hudlice (Beroun)
Hukvaldy (Frýdek-Místek)
Hulice (Benešov)
Hulín (town; Kroměříž)
Humburky (Hradec Králové)
Humpolec (town; Pelhřimov)
Huntířov (Děčín)
Hůrky (Rokycany)
Hurtova Lhota (Havlíčkův Brod)
Hůry (České Budějovice)
Husí Lhota (Mladá Boleslav)
Husinec (town; Prachatice)
Husinec (Prague-East)
Huslenky (Vsetín)
Hustopeče nad Bečvou (market town; Přerov)
Hustopeče (town; Břeclav)
Huštěnovice (Uherské Hradiště)
Hutisko-Solanec (Vsetín)
Huzová (Olomouc)
Hvězdlice (market town; Vyškov)
Hvězdonice (Benešov)
Hvězdoňovice (Třebíč)
Hvozd (Plzeň-North)
Hvozd (Prostějov)
Hvozd (Rakovník)
Hvozdec (Beroun)
Hvozdec (Brno-Country)
Hvozdec (České Budějovice)
Hvozdná (Zlín)
Hvozdnice (Hradec Králové)
Hvozdnice (Prague-West)
Hvožďany (Domažlice)
Hvožďany (Příbram)
Hybrálec (Jihlava)
Hynčice (Náchod)
Hynčina (Šumperk)
Hýskov (Beroun)
Hýsly (Hodonín)

I

Ivaň (Brno-Country)
Ivaň (Prostějov)
Ivančice (town; Brno-Country)
Ivanovice na Hané (town; Vyškov)

J

Jabkenice (Mladá Boleslav)
Jabloňany (Blansko)
Jablonec nad Jizerou (town; Semily)
Jablonec nad Nisou (city; Jablonec nad Nisou)
Jablonná (Příbram)
Jablonné nad Orlicí (town; Ústí nad Orlicí)
Jablonné v Podještědí (town; Liberec)
Jabloňov (Žďár nad Sázavou)
Jablůnka (Vsetín)
Jablunkov (town; Frýdek-Místek)
Jáchymov (town; Karlovy Vary)
Jahodov (Rychnov nad Kněžnou)
Jakartovice (Opava)
Jakubčovice nad Odrou (Nový Jičín)
Jakubov u Moravských Budějovic (Třebíč)
Jakubovice (Šumperk)
Jalubí (Uherské Hradiště)
Jamné nad Orlicí (Ústí nad Orlicí)
Jamné (Jihlava)
Jamolice (Znojmo)
Jámy (Žďár nad Sázavou)
Jankov (Benešov)
Jankov (České Budějovice)
Jankov (Pelhřimov)
Jankovice (Kroměříž)
Jankovice (Pardubice)
Jankovice (Uherské Hradiště)
Janoušov (Šumperk)
Janov (town; Bruntál)
Janov (Děčín)
Janov (Rakovník)
Janov (Rychnov nad Kněžnou)
Janov (Svitavy)
Janov nad Nisou (Jablonec nad Nisou)
Janová (Vsetín)
Janovice nad Úhlavou (town; Klatovy)
Janovice v Podještědí (Liberec)
Janovice (Frýdek-Místek)
Janská (Děčín)
Janské Lázně (town; Trutnov)
Janův Důl (Liberec)
Janůvky (Svitavy)
Jarcová (Vsetín)
Jarohněvice (Kroměříž)
Jaroměř (town; Náchod)
Jaroměřice nad Rokytnou (town; Třebíč)
Jaroměřice (Svitavy)
Jaroslav (Pardubice)
Jaroslavice (Znojmo)
Jarošov nad Nežárkou (Jindřichův Hradec)
Jarošov (Svitavy)
Jarov (Plzeň-South)
Jarov (Plzeň-North)
Jarpice (Kladno)
Jasenice (Třebíč)
Jasenná (Náchod)
Jasenná (Zlín)
Javor (Klatovy)
Javorek (Žďár nad Sázavou)
Javornice (Rychnov nad Kněžnou)
Javorník (Benešov)
Javorník (Hodonín)
Javorník (town; Jeseník)
Javorník (Svitavy)
Javorník (Ústí nad Orlicí)
Javůrek (Brno-Country)
Jedlá (Havlíčkův Brod)
Jedlany (Tábor)
Jedlí (Šumperk)
Jedlová (Svitavy)
Jedomělice (Kladno)
Jedousov (Pardubice)
Jedovnice (market town; Blansko)
Jehnědí (Ústí nad Orlicí)
Jemnice (town; Třebíč)
Jemníky (Kladno)
Jenčice (Litoměřice)
Jeneč (Prague-West)
Jeníkov (Chrudim)
Jeníkov (Teplice)
Jeníkovice (Hradec Králové)
Jeníkovice (Pardubice)
Jenišov (Karlovy Vary)
Jenišovice (Chrudim)
Jenišovice (Jablonec nad Nisou)
Jenštejn (Prague-East)
Jeřice (Jičín)
Jeřišno (Havlíčkův Brod)
Jeřmanice (Liberec)
Jersín (Jihlava)
Jesenec (Prostějov)
Jesenice (town; Prague-West)
Jesenice (Příbram)
Jesenice (town; Rakovník)
Jeseník nad Odrou (Nový Jičín)
Jeseník (town; Jeseník)
Jesenný (Semily)
Jestřabí Lhota (Kolín)
Jestřabí v Krkonoších (Semily)
Jestřabí (Zlín)
Jestřebí (Česká Lípa)
Jestřebí (Náchod)
Jestřebí (Šumperk)
Ješetice (Benešov)
Jetětice (Písek)
Jetřichov (Náchod)
Jetřichovice (Děčín)
Jevany (Kolín)
Jevíčko (town; Svitavy)
Jeviněves (Mělník)
Jevišovice (town; Znojmo)
Jevišovka (Břeclav)
Jezbořice (Pardubice)
Jezdkovice (Opava)
Jezdovice (Jihlava)
Jezernice (Přerov)
Jezeřany-Maršovice (Znojmo)
Ježená (Jihlava)
Ježkovice (Vyškov)
Ježov (Hodonín)
Ježov (Pelhřimov)
Ježovy (Klatovy)
Jickovice (Písek)
Jičín (town; Jičín)
Jičíněves (Jičín)
Jihlava (city; Jihlava)
Jihlávka (Jihlava)
Jíkev (Nymburk)
Jilem (Havlíčkův Brod)
Jilem (Jindřichův Hradec)
Jilemnice (town; Semily)
Jílové (town; Děčín)
Jílové u Držkova (Jablonec nad Nisou)
Jílové u Prahy (town; Prague-West)
Jílovice (České Budějovice)
Jílovice (Hradec Králové)
Jíloviště (Prague-West)
Jimlín (Louny)
Jimramov (market town; Žďár nad Sázavou)
Jinačovice (Brno-Country)
Jince (market town; Příbram)
Jindřichov (Bruntál)
Jindřichov (Přerov)
Jindřichov (Šumperk)
Jindřichovice (Jihlava)
Jindřichovice (Sokolov)
Jindřichovice pod Smrkem (Liberec)
Jindřichův Hradec (town; Jindřichův Hradec)
Jinín (Strakonice)
Jinočany (Prague-West)
Jinolice (Jičín)
Jinošov (Třebíč)
Jiratice (Třebíč)
Jiřetín pod Bukovou (Jablonec nad Nisou)
Jiřetín pod Jedlovou (Děčín)
Jiřice (Nymburk)
Jiřice (Pelhřimov)
Jiřice u Miroslavi (Znojmo)
Jiřice u Moravských Budějovic (Znojmo)
Jiříkov (Bruntál)
Jiříkov (town; Děčín)
Jiříkovice (Brno-Country)
Jirkov (town; Chomutov)
Jirny (Prague-East)
Jistebnice (town; Tábor)
Jistebník (Nový Jičín)
Jitkov (Havlíčkův Brod)
Jivina (Beroun)
Jivina (Mladá Boleslav)
Jívka (Trutnov)
Jivno (České Budějovice)
Jívová (Olomouc)
Jívoví (Žďár nad Sázavou)
Jizbice (Nymburk)
Jizerní Vtelno (Mladá Boleslav)
Josefov (Hodonín)
Josefov (Sokolov)
Josefův Důl (Jablonec nad Nisou)
Josefův Důl (Mladá Boleslav)

K

Kacákova Lhota (Jičín)
Kacanovy (Semily)
Kaceřov (Plzeň-North)
Kaceřov (Sokolov)
Kačice (Kladno)
Kačlehy (Jindřichův Hradec)
Kácov (market town; Kutná Hora)
Kadaň (town; Chomutov)
Kadlín (Mělník)
Kadolec (Žďár nad Sázavou)
Kadov (Strakonice)
Kadov (Znojmo)
Kadov (Žďár nad Sázavou)
Kájov (Český Krumlov)
Kakejcov (Rokycany)
Kalek (Chomutov)
Kalenice (Strakonice)
Kalhov (Jihlava)
Kaliště (Jihlava)
Kaliště (Pelhřimov)
Kaliště (Prague-East)
Kalivody (Rakovník)
Kaly (Brno-Country)
Kamberk (Benešov)
Kámen (Děčín)
Kámen (Havlíčkův Brod)
Kámen (Pelhřimov)
Kamenec u Poličky (Svitavy)
Kamenec (Rokycany)
Kamenice (market town; Jihlava)
Kamenice (Prague-East)
Kamenice nad Lipou (town; Pelhřimov)
Kamenický Šenov (town; Česká Lípa)
Kameničky (Chrudim)
Kameničná (Ústí nad Orlicí)
Kamenná (České Budějovice)
Kamenná (Jihlava)
Kamenná (Šumperk)
Kamenná (Třebíč)
Kamenná Horka (Svitavy)
Kamenná Lhota (Havlíčkův Brod)
Kamenné Zboží (Nymburk)
Kamenné Žehrovice (Kladno)
Kamenný Malíkov (Jindřichův Hradec)
Kamenný Most (Kladno)
Kamenný Přívoz (Prague-West)
Kamenný Újezd (České Budějovice)
Kamenný Újezd (Rokycany)
Kamýk nad Vltavou (Příbram)
Kamýk (Litoměřice)
Kanice (Brno-Country)
Kanice (Domažlice)
Kaničky (Domažlice)
Kanina (Mělník)
Kaňovice (Frýdek-Místek)
Kaňovice (Zlín)
Kaplice (town; Český Krumlov)
Káranice (Hradec Králové)
Káraný (Prague-East)
Kardašova Řečice (town; Jindřichův Hradec)
Kařez (Rokycany)
Kařízek (Rokycany)
Karle (Svitavy)
Karlík (Prague-West)
Karlín (Hodonín)
Karlov (Žďár nad Sázavou)
Karlova Studánka (Bruntál)
Karlova Ves (Rakovník)
Karlovice (Bruntál)
Karlovice (Semily)
Karlovice (Zlín)
Karlovy Vary (city; Karlovy Vary)
Karlštejn (market town; Beroun)
Karolín (Kroměříž)
Karolinka (town; Vsetín)
Karviná (city; Karviná)
Kasalice (Pardubice)
Kašava (Zlín)
Kasejovice (town; Plzeň-South)
Kašnice (Břeclav)
Kašperské Hory (town; Klatovy)
Kateřinice (Nový Jičín)
Kateřinice (Vsetín)
Katov (Brno-Country)
Katov (Tábor)
Katovice (market town; Strakonice)
Katusice (Mladá Boleslav)
Kaznějov (town; Plzeň-North)
Kbel (Kolín)
Kbel (Plzeň-South)
Kbelany (Plzeň-North)
Kbelnice (Jičín)
Kdousov (Třebíč)
Kdyně (town; Domažlice)
Keblice (Litoměřice)
Keblov (Benešov)
Kejnice (Klatovy)
Kejžlice (Pelhřimov)
Kelč (town; Vsetín)
Kelčany (Hodonín)
Kelníky (Zlín)
Kestřany (Písek)
Ketkovice (Brno-Country)
Klabava (Rokycany)
Kladeruby nad Oslavou (Třebíč)
Kladeruby (Vsetín)
Kladky (Prostějov)
Kladníky (Přerov)
Kladno (Chrudim)
Kladno (city; Kladno)
Kladruby (Benešov)
Kladruby (Rokycany)
Kladruby (Strakonice)
Kladruby (town; Tachov)
Kladruby (Teplice)
Kladruby nad Labem (Pardubice)
Klamoš (Hradec Králové)
Klapý (Litoměřice)
Klášter Hradiště nad Jizerou (Mladá Boleslav)
Klášter (Plzeň-South)
Klášterec nad Ohří (town; Chomutov)
Klášterec nad Orlicí (Ústí nad Orlicí)
Klášterní Skalice (Kolín)
Klášterská Lhota (Trutnov)
Klatovec (Jihlava)
Klatovy (town; Klatovy)
Klec (Jindřichův Hradec)
Klecany (town; Prague-East)
Klenčí pod Čerchovem (market town; Domažlice)
Kleneč (Litoměřice)
Klenová (Klatovy)
Klenovice na Hané (Prostějov)
Klenovice (Tábor)
Klentnice (Břeclav)
Klešice (Chrudim)
Klíčany (Prague-East)
Klimkovice (town; Ostrava-City)
Klínec (Prague-West)
Klíny (Most)
Klobouky u Brna (town; Břeclav)
Klobuky (Kladno)
Klokočí (Přerov)
Klokočí (Semily)
Klokočná (Prague-East)
Klokočov (Havlíčkův Brod)
Klopina (Šumperk)
Klopotovice (Prostějov)
Klučenice (Příbram)
Klučov (Kolín)
Klučov (Třebíč)
Kluky (Kutná Hora)
Kluky (Mladá Boleslav)
Kluky (Písek)
Kly (Mělník)
Kmetiněves (Kladno)
Kněždub (Hodonín)
Kněževes (Blansko)
Kněževes (Prague-West)
Kněževes (market town; Rakovník)
Kněževes (Žďár nad Sázavou)
Kněžice (Chrudim)
Kněžice (Jihlava)
Kněžice (Nymburk)
Kněžičky (Nymburk)
Kněžmost (Mladá Boleslav)
Kněžnice (Jičín)
Kněžpole (Uherské Hradiště)
Knínice (market town; Blansko)
Knínice (Jihlava)
Kňovice (Příbram)
Knovíz (Kladno)
Knyk (Havlíčkův Brod)
Koberovice (Pelhřimov)
Koberovy (Jablonec nad Nisou)
Kobeřice u Brna (Vyškov)
Kobeřice (Opava)
Kobylá nad Vidnavkou (Jeseník)
Kobylí (Břeclav)
Kobylice (Hradec Králové)
Kobylnice (Brno-Country)
Kobylnice (Kutná Hora)
Kobylnice (Mladá Boleslav)
Kobyly (Liberec)
Kocbeře (Trutnov)
Kocelovice (Strakonice)
Kochánky (Mladá Boleslav)
Kochánov (Havlíčkův Brod)
Koclířov (Svitavy)
Kočí (Chrudim)
Kočín (Plzeň-North)
Kočov (Tachov)
Kohoutov (Trutnov)
Kojatice (Třebíč)
Kojatín (Třebíč)
Kojátky (Vyškov)
Kojčice (Pelhřimov)
Kojetice (Mělník)
Kojetice (Třebíč)
Kojetín (Havlíčkův Brod)
Kojetín (town; Přerov)
Kojice (Pardubice)
Kokašice (Tachov)
Kokory (Přerov)
Kokořín (Mělník)
Kolaje (Nymburk)
Koldín (Ústí nad Orlicí)
Koleč (Kladno)
Kolešov (Rakovník)
Kolešovice (Rakovník)
Kolín (town; Kolín)
Kolinec (market town; Klatovy)
Kolomuty (Mladá Boleslav)
Kolová (Karlovy Vary)
Koloveč (market town; Domažlice)
Kolšov (Šumperk)
Komárno (Kroměříž)
Komárov (market town; Beroun)
Komárov (Olomouc)
Komárov (Tábor)
Komárov (Zlín)
Komárovice (Třebíč)
Komařice (České Budějovice)
Komňa (Uherské Hradiště)
Komorní Lhotka (Frýdek-Místek)
Komorovice (Pelhřimov)
Komořany (Vyškov)
Konárovice (Kolín)
Kondrac (Benešov)
Konecchlumí (Jičín)
Koněprusy (Beroun)
Koněšín (Třebíč)
Konětopy (Prague-East)
Konice (town; Prostějov)
Konojedy (Kolín)
Konstantinovy Lázně (Tachov)
Kopidlno (town; Jičín)
Kopidlo (Plzeň-North)
Kopřivná (Šumperk)
Kopřivnice (town; Nový Jičín)
Kořenec (Blansko)
Kořenice (Kolín)
Kořenov (Jablonec nad Nisou)
Korkyně (Příbram)
Kornatice (Rokycany)
Korno (Beroun)
Korolupy (Znojmo)
Korouhev (Svitavy)
Koroužné (Žďár nad Sázavou)
Korozluky (Most)
Koruna (Svitavy)
Koryčany (town; Kroměříž)
Koryta (Mladá Boleslav)
Koryta (Plzeň-North)
Korytná (Uherské Hradiště)
Košařiska (Frýdek-Místek)
Košátky (Mladá Boleslav)
Košetice (Pelhřimov)
Kosice (Hradec Králové)
Košice (Kutná Hora)
Košice (Tábor)
Kosičky (Hradec Králové)
Košík (Nymburk)
Košíky (Uherské Hradiště)
Košín (Tábor)
Kosmonosy (town; Mladá Boleslav)
Kosoř (Prague-West)
Kosořice (Mladá Boleslav)
Kosořín (Ústí nad Orlicí)
Kosov (Šumperk)
Kosova Hora (Příbram)
Košťálov (Semily)
Košťany (town; Teplice)
Kostelany nad Moravou (Uherské Hradiště)
Kostelany (Kroměříž)
Kostelec (Hodonín)
Kostelec (Jičín)
Kostelec (Jihlava)
Kostelec (Tachov)
Kostelec na Hané (town; Prostějov)
Kostelec nad Černými lesy (town; Kolín)
Kostelec nad Labem (town; Mělník)
Kostelec nad Orlicí (town; Rychnov nad Kněžnou)
Kostelec nad Vltavou (Písek)
Kostelec u Heřmanova Městce (Chrudim)
Kostelec u Holešova (Kroměříž)
Kostelec u Křížků (Prague-East)
Kostelecké Horky (Rychnov nad Kněžnou)
Kostelní Hlavno (Mladá Boleslav)
Kostelní Lhota (Nymburk)
Kostelní Myslová (Jihlava)
Kostelní Radouň (Jindřichův Hradec)
Kostelní Vydří (Jindřichův Hradec)
Kostěnice (Pardubice)
Kostice (Břeclav)
Koštice (Louny)
Kostníky (Třebíč)
Kostomlátky (Nymburk)
Kostomlaty nad Labem (Nymburk)
Kostomlaty pod Milešovkou (Teplice)
Kostomlaty pod Řípem (Litoměřice)
Kotenčice (Příbram)
Kotlasy (Žďár nad Sázavou)
Kotopeky (Beroun)
Kotovice (Plzeň-South)
Kotvrdovice (Blansko)
Kounice (market town; Nymburk)
Kounov (Rakovník)
Kounov (Rychnov nad Kněžnou)
Koupě (Příbram)
Kouřim (town; Kolín)
Kout na Šumavě (Domažlice)
Kouty (Havlíčkův Brod)
Kouty (Nymburk)
Kouty (Třebíč)
Kovač (Jičín)
Koválovice-Osíčany (Prostějov)
Kovalovice (Brno-Country)
Kováň (Mladá Boleslav)
Kovanec (Mladá Boleslav)
Kovanice (Nymburk)
Kovářov (Písek)
Kovářská (market town; Chomutov)
Kovčín (Klatovy)
Kozárov (Blansko)
Kozárovice (Příbram)
Kožichovice (Třebíč)
Kožlany (town; Plzeň-North)
Kozlany (Třebíč)
Kozlany (Vyškov)
Kožlí (Havlíčkův Brod)
Kožlí (Písek)
Kozlov (Havlíčkův Brod)
Kozlov (Jihlava)
Kozlov (Olomouc)
Kozlov (Žďár nad Sázavou)
Kozlovice (Frýdek-Místek)
Kozlovice (Plzeň-South)
Kozly (Česká Lípa)
Kozly (Louny)
Kozmice (Benešov)
Kozmice (Opava)
Kozojedy (Jičín)
Kozojedy (Plzeň-North)
Kozojedy (Prague-East)
Kozojedy (Rakovník)
Kozojídky (Hodonín)
Kozolupy (Plzeň-North)
Kozomín (Mělník)
Kožušany-Tážaly (Olomouc)
Kožušice (Vyškov)
Krabčice (Litoměřice)
Kraborovice (Havlíčkův Brod)
Krahulčí (Jihlava)
Krahulov (Třebíč)
Krajková (Sokolov)
Krajníčko (Strakonice)
Krakov (Rakovník)
Krakovany (Kolín)
Krakovec (Rakovník)
Kralice na Hané (market town; Prostějov)
Kralice nad Oslavou (Třebíč)
Králíky (Hradec Králové)
Králíky (town; Ústí nad Orlicí)
Králova Lhota (Písek)
Králova Lhota (Rychnov nad Kněžnou)
Královec (Trutnov)
Kralovice (town; Plzeň-North)
Královice (Kladno)
Královské Poříčí (Sokolov)
Kralupy nad Vltavou (town; Mělník)
Králův Dvůr (town; Beroun)
Kramolín (Plzeň-South)
Kramolín (Třebíč)
Kramolna (Náchod)
Kraselov (Strakonice)
Krásensko (Vyškov)
Krasíkov (Ústí nad Orlicí)
Krasíkovice (Pelhřimov)
Kraslice (town; Sokolov)
Krašlovice (Strakonice)
Krásná (Cheb)
Krásná (Frýdek-Místek)
Krásná Hora (Havlíčkův Brod)
Krásná Hora nad Vltavou (town; Příbram)
Krásná Lípa (town; Děčín)
Krásná Ves (Mladá Boleslav)
Krásné (Chrudim)
Krásné (Žďár nad Sázavou)
Krásné Údolí (town; Karlovy Vary)
Krásněves (Žďár nad Sázavou)
Krásno (town; Sokolov)
Krásný Dvůr (Louny)
Krásný Les (Karlovy Vary)
Krásný Les (Liberec)
Krasonice (Jihlava)
Krasov (Bruntál)
Krasová (Blansko)
Krašovice (Plzeň-North)
Krátká Ves (Havlíčkův Brod)
Kratochvilka (Brno-Country)
Kratonohy (Hradec Králové)
Krátošice (Tábor)
Kratušín (Prachatice)
Kravaře (Česká Lípa)
Kravaře (town; Opava)
Kravsko (Znojmo)
Krchleby (Kutná Hora)
Krchleby (Nymburk)
Krchleby (Rychnov nad Kněžnou)
Krchleby (Šumperk)
Krčmaň (Olomouc)
Křeč (Pelhřimov)
Křečhoř (Kolín)
Křečkov (Nymburk)
Křečovice (Benešov)
Krejnice (Strakonice)
Křekov (Zlín)
Křelov-Břuchotín (Olomouc)
Křelovice (Pelhřimov)
Křelovice (Plzeň-North)
Křemže (market town; Český Krumlov)
Křenek (Prague-East)
Křenice (Klatovy)
Křenice (Prague-East)
Křenov (Svitavy)
Křenovice (Písek)
Křenovice (Přerov)
Křenovice (Vyškov)
Křenovy (Domažlice)
Křepenice (Příbram)
Křepice (Břeclav)
Křepice (Znojmo)
Křesetice (Kutná Hora)
Křesín (Litoměřice)
Křešice (Litoměřice)
Křešín (Pelhřimov)
Křešín (Příbram)
Křetín (Blansko)
Krhanice (Benešov)
Krhov (Blansko)
Krhov (Třebíč)
Krhovice (Znojmo)
Křičeň (Pardubice)
Křídla (Žďár nad Sázavou)
Křídlůvky (Znojmo)
Křimov (Chomutov)
Křinec (market town; Nymburk)
Křinice (Náchod)
Křišťanov (Prachatice)
Křišťanovice (Bruntál)
Křivoklát (market town; Rakovník)
Křivsoudov (market town; Benešov)
Křižánky (Žďár nad Sázavou)
Křižanov (Písek)
Křižanov (market town; Žďár nad Sázavou)
Křižanovice (Chrudim)
Křižanovice (Vyškov)
Křižanovice u Vyškova (Vyškov)
Křižany (Liberec)
Křižínkov (Brno-Country)
Křížkový Újezdec (Prague-East)
Křižovatka (Cheb)
Krmelín (Frýdek-Místek)
Krňany (Benešov)
Krnov (town; Bruntál)
Krnsko (Mladá Boleslav)
Krokočín (Třebíč)
Kroměříž (town; Kroměříž)
Krompach (Česká Lípa)
Kropáčova Vrutice (Mladá Boleslav)
Kroučová (Rakovník)
Krouna (Chrudim)
Křoví (Žďár nad Sázavou)
Krsy (Plzeň-North)
Křtěnov (Blansko)
Křtiny (market town; Blansko)
Křtomil (Přerov)
Krtov (Tábor)
Krty (Rakovník)
Krty-Hradec (Strakonice)
Krucemburk (market town; Havlíčkův Brod)
Kruh (Semily)
Krumsín (Prostějov)
Krumvíř (Břeclav)
Krupá (Kolín)
Krupá (Rakovník)
Krupka (town; Teplice)
Krušovice (Rakovník)
Kružberk (Opava)
Krychnov (Kolín)
Kryry (town; Louny)
Kryštofovo Údolí (Liberec)
Kryštofovy Hamry (Chomutov)
Kšely (Kolín)
Kšice (Tachov)
Ktiš (Prachatice)
Ktová (Semily)
Kublov (Beroun)
Kubova Huť (Prachatice)
Kubšice (Znojmo)
Kučerov (Vyškov)
Kučeř (Písek)
Kudlovice (Uherské Hradiště)
Kuchařovice (Znojmo)
Kujavy (Nový Jičín)
Kukle (Svitavy)
Kuklík (Žďár nad Sázavou)
Kuks (Trutnov)
Kulířov (Blansko)
Kunčice nad Labem (Trutnov)
Kunčice pod Ondřejníkem (Frýdek-Místek)
Kunčice (Hradec Králové)
Kunčina Ves (Blansko)
Kunčina (Svitavy)
Kundratice (Žďár nad Sázavou)
Kunějovice (Plzeň-North)
Kunemil (Havlíčkův Brod)
Kunětice (Pardubice)
Kunice (Blansko)
Kunice (Prague-East)
Kuničky (Blansko)
Kunín (Nový Jičín)
Kunkovice (Kroměříž)
Kuňovice (Benešov)
Kunovice (town; Uherské Hradiště)
Kunovice (Vsetín)
Kunratice (Děčín)
Kunratice (Liberec)
Kunratice u Cvikova (Česká Lípa)
Kunštát (town; Blansko)
Kunvald (market town; Ústí nad Orlicí)
Kunžak (Jindřichův Hradec)
Kupařovice (Brno-Country)
Kurdějov (Břeclav)
Kuřim (town; Brno-Country)
Kuřimany (Strakonice)
Kuřimská Nová Ves (Brno-Country)
Kuřimské Jestřabí (Brno-Country)
Kuroslepy (Třebíč)
Kurovice (Kroměříž)
Kutná Hora (town; Kutná Hora)
Kutrovice (Kladno)
Kuželov (Hodonín)
Kvasice (Kroměříž)
Kvasiny (Rychnov nad Kněžnou)
Kváskovice (Strakonice)
Kvášňovice (Klatovy)
Květinov (Havlíčkův Brod)
Květná (Svitavy)
Květnice (Prague-East)
Květov (Písek)
Kvíčovice (Plzeň-South)
Kvilda (Prachatice)
Kvílice (Kladno)
Kvítkov (Česká Lípa)
Kvítkovice (České Budějovice)
Kyje (Jičín)
Kyjov (Havlíčkův Brod)
Kyjov (town; Hodonín)
Kyjov (Žďár nad Sázavou)
Kyjovice (Opava)
Kyjovice (Znojmo)
Kynice (Havlíčkův Brod)
Kynšperk nad Ohří (town; Sokolov)
Kyselka (Karlovy Vary)
Kyselovice (Kroměříž)
Kyšice (Kladno)
Kyšice (Plzeň-City)
Kyškovice (Litoměřice)
Kytín (Prague-West)
Kytlice (Děčín)

L

Labská Stráň (Děčín)
Labské Chrčice (Pardubice)
Labuty (Hodonín)
Lačnov (Vsetín)
Ladná (Břeclav)
Lahošt (Teplice)
Lampertice (Trutnov)
Lančov (Znojmo)
Lánov (Trutnov)
Lanškroun (town; Ústí nad Orlicí)
Lány (Chrudim)
Lány (Havlíčkův Brod)
Lány (Kladno)
Lány u Dašic (Pardubice)
Lanžhot (town; Břeclav)
Lanžov (Trutnov)
Lásenice (Jindřichův Hradec)
Laškov (Prostějov)
Lašovice (Rakovník)
Lavičky (Žďár nad Sázavou)
Lavičné (Svitavy)
Láz (Příbram)
Láz (Třebíč)
Lazinov (Blansko)
Lázně Bělohrad (town; Jičín)
Lázně Bohdaneč (town; Pardubice)
Lázně Kynžvart (town; Cheb)
Lázně Libverda (Liberec)
Lázně Toušeň (market town; Prague-East)
Lazníčky (Přerov)
Lazníky (Přerov)
Lazsko (Příbram)
Lažánky (Brno-Country)
Lažánky (Strakonice)
Lažany (Blansko)
Lažany (Liberec)
Lažany (Strakonice)
Lažiště (Prachatice)
Lážovice (Beroun)
Lčovice (Prachatice)
Ledce (Brno-Country)
Ledce (Hradec Králové)
Ledce (Kladno)
Ledce (Mladá Boleslav)
Ledce (Plzeň-North)
Ledčice (Mělník)
Ledeč nad Sázavou (town; Havlíčkův Brod)
Ledečko (Kutná Hora)
Ledenice (market town; České Budějovice)
Lednice (Břeclav)
Ledvice (town; Teplice)
Lechotice (Kroměříž)
Lechovice (Znojmo)
Lejšovka (Hradec Králové)
Lelekovice (Brno-Country)
Lenešice (Louny)
Lenora (Prachatice)
Lešany (Benešov)
Lešany (Prostějov)
Lešetice (Příbram)
Leskovec (Vsetín)
Leskovec nad Moravicí (Bruntál)
Leškovice (Havlíčkův Brod)
Leskovice (Pelhřimov)
Lesná (Pelhřimov)
Lesná (Tachov)
Lesná (Třebíč)
Lešná (Vsetín)
Lesná (Znojmo)
Lesní Hluboké (Brno-Country)
Lesní Jakubov (Třebíč)
Lesnice (Šumperk)
Lesonice (Třebíč)
Lesonice (Znojmo)
Leština (Chrudim)
Leština (Šumperk)
Leština u Světlé (Havlíčkův Brod)
Leštinka (Chrudim)
Lestkov (Tachov)
Lesůňky (Třebíč)
Letiny (Plzeň-South)
Letkov (Plzeň-City)
Letohrad (town; Ústí nad Orlicí)
Letonice (Vyškov)
Letovice (town; Blansko)
Lety (Písek)
Lety (Prague-West)
Levín (market town; Litoměřice)
Levínská Olešnice (Semily)
Lhánice (Třebíč)
Lhenice (market town; Prachatice)
Lhota-Vlasenice (Pelhřimov)
Lhota (Kladno)
Lhota (Prague-East)
Lhota (Přerov)
Lhota (Zlín)
Lhota pod Hořičkami (Náchod)
Lhota pod Libčany (Hradec Králové)
Lhota pod Radčem (Rokycany)
Lhota Rapotina (Blansko)
Lhota u Lysic (Blansko)
Lhota u Olešnice (Blansko)
Lhota u Příbramě (Příbram)
Lhota u Vsetína (Vsetín)
Lhotice (Třebíč)
Lhotka (Beroun)
Lhotka (Frýdek-Místek)
Lhotka (Jihlava)
Lhotka (Mělník)
Lhotka (Přerov)
Lhotka (Žďár nad Sázavou)
Lhotka nad Labem (Litoměřice)
Lhotka u Litultovic (Opava)
Lhotka u Radnic (Rokycany)
Lhotky (Mladá Boleslav)
Lhotsko (Zlín)
Lhoty u Potštejna (Rychnov nad Kněžnou)
Lhůta (Plzeň-City)
Libá (Cheb)
Libáň (town; Jičín)
Libavské Údolí (Sokolov)
Libčany (Hradec Králové)
Libčeves (Louny)
Libčice nad Vltavou (town; Prague-West)
Libecina (Ústí nad Orlicí)
Libědice (Chomutov)
Liběchov (town; Mělník)
Libějice (Tábor)
Libějovice (Strakonice)
Libel (Rychnov nad Kněžnou)
Libenice (Kolín)
Liberec (city; Liberec)
Liberk (Rychnov nad Kněžnou)
Libeř (Prague-West)
Liběšice (Litoměřice)
Liběšice (Louny)
Libětice (Strakonice)
Líbeznice (Prague-East)
Libež (Benešov)
Libchavy (Ústí nad Orlicí)
Libchyně (Náchod)
Libice nad Cidlinou (Nymburk)
Libice nad Doubravou (market town; Havlíčkův Brod)
Libín (České Budějovice)
Libina (Šumperk)
Libiš (Mělník)
Libišany (Pardubice)
Libkov (Domažlice)
Libkov (Chrudim)
Libkova Voda (Pelhřimov)
Libkovice pod Řípem (Litoměřice)
Liblice (Mělník)
Liblín (market town; Rokycany)
Libňatov (Trutnov)
Libníč (České Budějovice)
Libníkovice (Hradec Králové)
Libočany (Louny)
Libodřice (Kolín)
Libochovany (Litoměřice)
Libochovice (town; Litoměřice)
Libochovičky (Kladno)
Liboměřice (Chrudim)
Libomyšl (Beroun)
Libořice (Louny)
Liboš (Olomouc)
Libošovice (Jičín)
Libotenice (Litoměřice)
Libotov (Trutnov)
Libouchec (Ústí nad Labem)
Libovice (Kladno)
Librantice (Hradec Králové)
Libřice (Hradec Králové)
Libštát (market town; Semily)
Libuň (Jičín)
Libušín (town; Kladno)
Licibořice (Chrudim)
Lično (Rychnov nad Kněžnou)
Lidečko (Vsetín)
Lidice (Kladno)
Lidmaň (Pelhřimov)
Lichkov (Ústí nad Orlicí)
Lichnov (Bruntál)
Lichnov (Nový Jičín)
Lichoceves (Prague-West)
Líně (Plzeň-North)
Linhartice (Svitavy)
Lípa (Havlíčkův Brod)
Lípa (Zlín)
Lípa nad Orlicí (Rychnov nad Kněžnou)
Lipec (Kolín)
Lipí (České Budějovice)
Lipina (Olomouc)
Lipinka (Šumperk)
Lipnice nad Sázavou (town; Havlíčkův Brod)
Lipník (Mladá Boleslav)
Lipník (Třebíč)
Lipník nad Bečvou (town; Přerov)
Lipno (Louny)
Lipno nad Vltavou (Český Krumlov)
Lipoltice (Pardubice)
Lipov (Hodonín)
Lipová (Cheb)
Lipová (Děčín)
Lipová (Prostějov)
Lipová (Přerov)
Lipová (Zlín)
Lipová-lázně (Jeseník)
Lipovec (Blansko)
Lipovec (Chrudim)
Lipovice (Prachatice)
Liptál (Vsetín)
Liptaň (Bruntál)
Lipůvka (Blansko)
Lišany (Louny)
Lišany (Rakovník)
Lísek (Žďár nad Sázavou)
Lišice (Hradec Králové)
Líšina (Plzeň-South)
Lískovice (Jičín)
Líský (Kladno)
Líšná (Přerov)
Líšná (Rokycany)
Líšná (Žďár nad Sázavou)
Líšnice (Prague-West)
Líšnice (Šumperk)
Líšnice (Ústí nad Orlicí)
Lišnice (Most)
Líšný (Jablonec nad Nisou)
Lišov (town; České Budějovice)
Lisov (Plzeň-South)
Líšťany (Louny)
Líšťany (Plzeň-North)
Líté (Plzeň-North)
Liteň (market town; Beroun)
Litenčice (market town; Kroměříž)
Litíč (Trutnov)
Litichovice (Benešov)
Litoboř (Náchod)
Litobratřice (Znojmo)
Litohlavy (Rokycany)
Litohoř (Třebíč)
Litohošť (Pelhřimov)
Litochovice (Strakonice)
Litoměřice (town; Litoměřice)
Litomyšl (town; Svitavy)
Litostrov (Brno-Country)
Litošice (Pardubice)
Litovany (Třebíč)
Litovel (town; Olomouc)
Litultovice (market town; Opava)
Litvínov (town; Most)
Litvínovice (České Budějovice)
Lkáň (Litoměřice)
Lnáře (Strakonice)
Lobeč (Mělník)
Lobendava (Děčín)
Lobodice (Přerov)
Ločenice (České Budějovice)
Loděnice (Beroun)
Loděnice (Brno-Country)
Lodhéřov (Jindřichův Hradec)
Lodín (Hradec Králové)
Lochenice (Hradec Králové)
Lochousice (Plzeň-North)
Lochovice (Beroun)
Loket (Benešov)
Loket (town; Sokolov)
Lom (town; Most)
Lom (Strakonice)
Lom (Tábor)
Lom u Tachova (Tachov)
Lomec (Klatovy)
Lomnice (market town; Brno-Country)
Lomnice (Bruntál)
Lomnice (Sokolov)
Lomnice nad Lužnicí (town; Jindřichův Hradec)
Lomnice nad Popelkou (town; Semily)
Lomnička (Brno-Country)
Lomy (Třebíč)
Lopeník (Uherské Hradiště)
Losiná (Plzeň-City)
Lošany (Kolín)
Loštice (town; Šumperk)
Loučany (Olomouc)
Loučeň (market town; Nymburk)
Loučim (Domažlice)
Loucká (Kladno)
Loučka (Olomouc)
Loučka (Vsetín)
Loučka (Zlín)
Loučky (Semily)
Loučná nad Desnou (Šumperk)
Loučná pod Klínovcem (town; Chomutov)
Loučovice (Český Krumlov)
Louka (Blansko)
Louka (Hodonín)
Louka u Litvínova (Most)
Loukov (Kroměříž)
Loukov (Mladá Boleslav)
Loukovec (Mladá Boleslav)
Loukovice (Třebíč)
Louňová (Plzeň-South)
Louňovice pod Blaníkem (market town; Benešov)
Louňovice (Prague-East)
Louny (town; Louny)
Loužnice (Jablonec nad Nisou)
Lovčice (Hodonín)
Lovčice (Hradec Králové)
Lovčičky (Vyškov)
Lovčovice (Třebíč)
Lovečkovice (Litoměřice)
Lovosice (town; Litoměřice)
Loza (Plzeň-North)
Lozice (Chrudim)
Lštění (Benešov)
Lubě (Blansko)
Lubenec (Louny)
Luběnice (Olomouc)
Lubná (Kroměříž)
Lubná (Rakovník)
Lubná (Svitavy)
Lubné (Brno-Country)
Lubnice (Znojmo)
Lubník (Ústí nad Orlicí)
Luboměř (Nový Jičín)
Luboměř pod Strážnou (Olomouc)
Luby (town; Cheb)
Lučany nad Nisou (town; Jablonec nad Nisou)
Lučice (Havlíčkův Brod)
Lučina (Frýdek-Místek)
Ludgeřovice (Opava)
Ludíkov (Blansko)
Ludkovice (Zlín)
Ludmírov (Prostějov)
Ludslavice (Kroměříž)
Ludvíkov (Bruntál)
Ludvíkovice (Děčín)
Luhačovice (town; Zlín)
Luka (Česká Lípa)
Luká (Olomouc)
Luka nad Jihlavou (market town; Jihlava)
Lukavec (Litoměřice)
Lukavec (market town; Pelhřimov)
Lukavec u Hořic (Jičín)
Lukavice (Chrudim)
Lukavice (Rychnov nad Kněžnou)
Lukavice (Šumperk)
Lukavice (Ústí nad Orlicí)
Lukov (Teplice)
Lukov (Třebíč)
Lukov (Zlín)
Lukov (market town; Znojmo)
Luková (Ústí nad Orlicí)
Lukovany (Brno-Country)
Lukoveček (Zlín)
Luleč (Vyškov)
Lupenice (Rychnov nad Kněžnou)
Luštěnice (Mladá Boleslav)
Lutín (Olomouc)
Lutonina (Zlín)
Lutopecny (Kroměříž)
Lužany (Hradec Králové)
Lužany (Jičín)
Lužany (Plzeň-South)
Lužce (Beroun)
Luže (town; Chrudim)
Lužec nad Cidlinou (Hradec Králové)
Lužec nad Vltavou (Mělník)
Luženičky (Domažlice)
Lužice (Hodonín)
Lužice (Most)
Lužice (Olomouc)
Lužice (Prachatice)
Lužná (Rakovník)
Lužná (Vsetín)
Lužnice (Jindřichův Hradec)
Lysá nad Labem (town; Nymburk)
Lysice (market town; Blansko)
Lysovice (Vyškov)

M

Machov (market town; Náchod)
Machová (Zlín)
Mackovice (Znojmo)
Mačkov (Strakonice)
Mahouš (Prachatice)
Majdalena (Jindřichův Hradec)
Majetín (Olomouc)
Makotřasy (Kladno)
Makov (Blansko)
Makov (Svitavy)
Malá Bystřice (Vsetín)
Malá Hraštice (Příbram)
Malá Lhota (Blansko)
Malá Losenice (Žďár nad Sázavou)
Malá Morava (Šumperk)
Malá Morávka (Bruntál)
Malá Roudka (Blansko)
Malá Skála (Jablonec nad Nisou)
Malá Štáhle (Bruntál)
Malá Úpa (Trutnov)
Malá Veleň (Děčín)
Malá Víska (Beroun)
Malá Vrbka (Hodonín)
Malčín (Havlíčkův Brod)
Malé Březno (Most)
Malé Březno (Ústí nad Labem)
Malé Hradisko (Prostějov)
Malé Kyšice (Kladno)
Malé Přítočno (Kladno)
Malé Svatoňovice (Trutnov)
Malé Výkleky (Pardubice)
Malé Žernoseky (Litoměřice)
Maleč (Havlíčkův Brod)
Malečov (Ústí nad Labem)
Malenice (Strakonice)
Malenovice (Frýdek-Místek)
Malešov (market town; Kutná Hora)
Malešovice (Brno-Country)
Maletín (Šumperk)
Malhostovice (Brno-Country)
Malhotice (Přerov)
Malíč (Litoměřice)
Malíkov (Svitavy)
Malíkovice (Kladno)
Malínky (Vyškov)
Malinová (Rakovník)
Málkov (Beroun)
Málkov (Chomutov)
Malonty (Český Krumlov)
Malotice (Kolín)
Malovice (Prachatice)
Malšice (market town; Tábor)
Malšín (Český Krumlov)
Malšovice (Děčín)
Malý Beranov (Jihlava)
Malý Bor (Klatovy)
Malý Újezd (Mělník)
Manětín (town; Plzeň-North)
Mankovice (Nový Jičín)
Maňovice (Klatovy)
Mariánské Lázně (town; Cheb)
Mariánské Radčice (Most)
Markvartice (Děčín)
Markvartice (Jičín)
Markvartice (Jihlava)
Markvartice (Třebíč)
Markvartovice (Opava)
Maršov u Úpice (Trutnov)
Maršov (Brno-Country)
Maršovice (market town; Benešov)
Maršovice (Jablonec nad Nisou)
Martiněves (Litoměřice)
Martinice (Kroměříž)
Martinice (Žďár nad Sázavou)
Martinice u Onšova (Pelhřimov)
Martinice v Krkonoších (Semily)
Martínkov (Třebíč)
Martínkovice (Náchod)
Mařenice (Česká Lípa)
Máslojedy (Hradec Králové)
Máslovice (Prague-East)
Masojedy (Kolín)
Mastník (Třebíč)
Mašovice (Znojmo)
Mašťov (town; Chomutov)
Matějov (Žďár nad Sázavou)
Mazelov (České Budějovice)
Mažice (Tábor)
Mcely (Nymburk)
Meclov (Domažlice)
Mečeříž (Mladá Boleslav)
Měchenice (Prague-West)
Měcholupy (market town; Louny)
Měcholupy (Plzeň-South)
Mečichov (Strakonice)
Měčín (town; Klatovy)
Měděnec (Chomutov)
Medlice (Znojmo)
Medlov (market town; Brno-Country)
Medlov (Olomouc)
Medlovice (Uherské Hradiště)
Medlovice (Vyškov)
Medonosy (Mělník)
Medový Újezd (Rokycany)
Měkynec (Strakonice)
Melč (Opava)
Mělčany (Brno-Country)
Mělnické Vtelno (Mělník)
Mělník (town; Mělník)
Měňany (Beroun)
Menhartice (Třebíč)
Měník (Hradec Králové)
Měnín (Brno-Country)
Merboltice (Děčín)
Měřín (market town; Žďár nad Sázavou)
Merklín (Karlovy Vary)
Merklín (Plzeň-South)
Měrotín (Olomouc)
Měrovice nad Hanou (Přerov)
Měrunice (Teplice)
Měšice (Prague-East)
Měšín (Jihlava)
Mešno (Rokycany)
Městec Králové (town; Nymburk)
Městečko Trnávka (Svitavy)
Městečko (Rakovník)
Město Albrechtice (town; Bruntál)
Město Libavá (Olomouc)
Město Touškov (town; Plzeň-North)
Metylovice (Frýdek-Místek)
Mezholezy (former Domažlice District) (Domažlice)
Mezholezy (former Horšovský Týn District) (Domažlice)
Meziboří (town; Most)
Mezihoří (Klatovy)
Mezilečí (Náchod)
Mezilesí (Náchod)
Mezilesí (Pelhřimov)
Meziměstí (town; Náchod)
Mezina (Bruntál)
Meziříčí (Tábor)
Meziříčko (Třebíč)
Meziříčko (Žďár nad Sázavou)
Mezná (Pelhřimov)
Mezná (Tábor)
Mezno (Benešov)
Mezouň (Beroun)
Míčov-Sušice (Chrudim)
Mičovice (Prachatice)
Michalovice (Havlíčkův Brod)
Michalovice (Litoměřice)
Míchov (Blansko)
Mikolajice (Opava)
Mikulášovice (town; Děčín)
Mikulčice (Hodonín)
Mikuleč (Svitavy)
Mikulov (town; Břeclav)
Mikulov (Teplice)
Mikulovice (Jeseník)
Mikulovice (Pardubice)
Mikulovice (Třebíč)
Mikulovice (market town; Znojmo)
Mikulůvka (Vsetín)
Milasín (Žďár nad Sázavou)
Milavče (Domažlice)
Milčice (Nymburk)
Mileč (Plzeň-South)
Milejovice (Strakonice)
Milenov (Přerov)
Milešín (Žďár nad Sázavou)
Milešov (Příbram)
Milešovice (Vyškov)
Miletín (town; Jičín)
Milevsko (town; Písek)
Milhostov (Cheb)
Miličín (town; Benešov)
Milíčov (Jihlava)
Milíčovice (Znojmo)
Milíkov (Cheb)
Milíkov (Frýdek-Místek)
Milín (Příbram)
Milínov (Plzeň-South)
Milíře (Tachov)
Milonice (Blansko)
Milonice (Vyškov)
Miloňovice (Strakonice)
Milostín (Rakovník)
Milotice nad Bečvou (Přerov)
Milotice nad Opavou (Bruntál)
Milotice (Hodonín)
Milovice (Břeclav)
Milovice (town; Nymburk)
Milovice u Hořic (Jičín)
Milý (Rakovník)
Mimoň (town; Česká Lípa)
Minice (Písek)
Mirkovice (Český Krumlov)
Miroslav (town; Znojmo)
Miroslavské Knínice (Znojmo)
Mirošov (Jihlava)
Mirošov (town; Rokycany)
Mirošov (Žďár nad Sázavou)
Mirošovice (Prague-East)
Mirotice (town; Písek)
Mírov (Šumperk)
Mírová pod Kozákovem (Semily)
Mírová (Karlovy Vary)
Mirovice (town; Písek)
Miřejovice (Litoměřice)
Miřetice (Benešov)
Miřetice (Chrudim)
Mířkov (Domažlice)
Miskovice (Kutná Hora)
Místo (Chomutov)
Mistrovice (Ústí nad Orlicí)
Mistřice (Uherské Hradiště)
Míškovice (Kroměříž)
Míšov (Plzeň-South)
Mišovice (Písek)
Mladá Boleslav (city; Mladá Boleslav)
Mladá Vožice (town; Tábor)
Mladé Bříště (Pelhřimov)
Mladé Buky (market town; Trutnov)
Mladecko (Opava)
Mladeč (Olomouc)
Mladějov na Moravě (Svitavy)
Mladějov (Jičín)
Mladějovice (Olomouc)
Mladkov (market town; Ústí nad Orlicí)
Mladoňovice (Chrudim)
Mladoňovice (Třebíč)
Mladošovice (České Budějovice)
Mladotice (Plzeň-North)
Mladý Smolivec (Plzeň-South)
Mlázovice (market town; Jičín)
Mlečice (Rokycany)
Mlékojedy (Litoměřice)
Mlékosrby (Hradec Králové)
Mlýnské Struhadlo (Klatovy)
Mlýny (Tábor)
Mnetěš (Litoměřice)
Mnich (Pelhřimov)
Mnichov (Domažlice)
Mnichov (Cheb)
Mnichov (Strakonice)
Mnichovice (Benešov)
Mnichovice (town; Prague-East)
Mnichovo Hradiště (town; Mladá Boleslav)
Mníšek pod Brdy (town; Prague-West)
Mníšek (Liberec)
Močerady (Domažlice)
Mochov (Prague-East)
Mochtín (Klatovy)
Močovice (Kutná Hora)
Modlany (Teplice)
Modletice (Prague-East)
Modlíkov (Havlíčkův Brod)
Modrá Hůrka (České Budějovice)
Modrá (Uherské Hradiště)
Modrava (Klatovy)
Modřice (town; Brno-Country)
Modřišice (Semily)
Modřovice (Příbram)
Mohelnice (Plzeň-South)
Mohelnice (town; Šumperk)
Mohelnice nad Jizerou (Mladá Boleslav)
Mohelno (market town; Třebíč)
Mojné (Český Krumlov)
Mokošín (Pardubice)
Mokrá-Horákov (Brno-Country)
Mokré Lazce (Opava)
Mokré (Rychnov nad Kněžnou)
Mokrosuky (Klatovy)
Mokrouše (Plzeň-City)
Mokrovousy (Hradec Králové)
Mokrovraty (Příbram)
Mokrý Lom (České Budějovice)
Moldava (Teplice)
Morašice (Chrudim)
Morašice (Pardubice)
Morašice (Svitavy)
Morašice (Znojmo)
Moravany (Brno-Country)
Moravany (Hodonín)
Moravany (Pardubice)
Moravec (Žďár nad Sázavou)
Moravecké Pavlovice (Žďár nad Sázavou)
Moraveč (Pelhřimov)
Moravice (Opava)
Moravičany (Šumperk)
Morávka (Frýdek-Místek)
Moravská Nová Ves (market town; Břeclav)
Moravská Třebová (town; Svitavy)
Moravské Bránice (Brno-Country)
Moravské Budějovice (town; Třebíč)
Moravské Knínice (Brno-Country)
Moravské Málkovice (Vyškov)
Moravskoslezský Kočov (Bruntál)
Moravský Beroun (town; Olomouc)
Moravský Krumlov (town; Znojmo)
Moravský Písek (Hodonín)
Moravský Žižkov (Břeclav)
Morkovice-Slížany (town; Kroměříž)
Morkůvky (Břeclav)
Mořice (Prostějov)
Mořina (Beroun)
Mořinka (Beroun)
Mořkov (Nový Jičín)
Most (city; Most)
Mostek (Trutnov)
Mostek (Ústí nad Orlicí)
Mostkovice (Prostějov)
Mosty u Jablunkova (Frýdek-Místek)
Mošnov (Nový Jičín)
Mouchnice (Hodonín)
Mouřínov (Vyškov)
Moutnice (Brno-Country)
Mrač (Benešov)
Mrákotín (Chrudim)
Mrákotín (market town; Jihlava)
Mrákov (Domažlice)
Mratín (Prague-East)
Mrlínek (Kroměříž)
Mrsklesy (Olomouc)
Mrtník (Plzeň-North)
Mrzky (Kolín)
Mříčná (Semily)
Mšec (market town; Rakovník)
Mšecké Žehrovice (Rakovník)
Mšené-lázně (Litoměřice)
Mšeno (town; Mělník)
Mukařov (Mladá Boleslav)
Mukařov (Prague-East)
Mutějovice (Rakovník)
Mutěnice (Hodonín)
Mutěnice (Strakonice)
Mutěnín (Domažlice)
Mutkov (Olomouc)
Mydlovary (České Budějovice)
Myslejovice (Prostějov)
Mysletice (Jihlava)
Mysletín (Pelhřimov)
Mysliboř (Jihlava)
Myslibořice (Třebíč)
Myslín (Písek)
Myslinka (Plzeň-North)
Myslív (Klatovy)
Myslkovice (Tábor)
Mysločovice (Zlín)
Myslovice (Klatovy)
Myštěves (Hradec Králové)
Myštice (Strakonice)
Mýto (town; Rokycany)
Mžany (Hradec Králové)

N

Nabočany (Chrudim)
Načeradec (market town; Benešov)
Načešice (Chrudim)
Náchod (town; Náchod)
Nadějkov (Tábor)
Nadějov (Jihlava)
Nadryby (Plzeň-North)
Nahořany (Náchod)
Nahošovice (Přerov)
Náklo (Olomouc)
Nákří (České Budějovice)
Naloučany (Třebíč)
Nalžovice (Příbram)
Nalžovské Hory (town; Klatovy)
Náměšť na Hané (market town; Olomouc)
Náměšť nad Oslavou (town; Třebíč)
Napajedla (town; Zlín)
Nárameč (Třebíč)
Narysov (Příbram)
Nasavrky (town; Chrudim)
Nasavrky (Tábor)
Nasavrky (Ústí nad Orlicí)
Násedlovice (Hodonín)
Našiměřice (Znojmo)
Návojná (Zlín)
Návsí (Frýdek-Místek)
Nebahovy (Prachatice)
Nebanice (Cheb)
Nebílovy (Plzeň-South)
Nebovidy (Brno-Country)
Nebovidy (Kolín)
Nebřehovice (Strakonice)
Nebužely (Mělník)
Nechanice (town; Hradec Králové)
Nechvalice (Příbram)
Nechvalín (Hodonín)
Nečín (Příbram)
Nečtiny (Plzeň-North)
Nedabyle (České Budějovice)
Nedachlebice (Uherské Hradiště)
Nedakonice (Uherské Hradiště)
Nedašov (Zlín)
Nedašova Lhota (Zlín)
Neděliště (Hradec Králové)
Nedomice (Mělník)
Nedrahovice (Příbram)
Nedvědice (market town; Brno-Country)
Nedvězí (Svitavy)
Nehodiv (Klatovy)
Nehvizdy (market town; Prague-East)
Nejdek (town; Karlovy Vary)
Nejepín (Havlíčkův Brod)
Nekmíř (Plzeň-North)
Nekoř (Ústí nad Orlicí)
Nekvasovy (Plzeň-South)
Nelahozeves (Mělník)
Nelepeč-Žernůvka (Brno-Country)
Nelešovice (Přerov)
Nemanice (Domažlice)
Němčany (Vyškov)
Němčice (Blansko)
Němčice (Domažlice)
Němčice (Kolín)
Němčice (Kroměříž)
Němčice (Mladá Boleslav)
Němčice (Pardubice)
Němčice (Prachatice)
Němčice (Strakonice)
Němčice (Svitavy)
Němčice nad Hanou (town; Prostějov)
Němčičky (Brno-Country)
Němčičky (Břeclav)
Němčičky (Znojmo)
Němčovice (Rokycany)
Němětice (Strakonice)
Nemile (Šumperk)
Nemíž (Benešov)
Nemochovice (Vyškov)
Nemojany (Vyškov)
Nemojov (Trutnov)
Nemotice (Vyškov)
Nemyčeves (Jičín)
Nemyslovice (Mladá Boleslav)
Nemyšl (Tábor)
Nenačovice (Beroun)
Nenkovice (Hodonín)
Neplachov (České Budějovice)
Neplachovice (Opava)
Nepolisy (Hradec Králové)
Nepoměřice (Kutná Hora)
Nepomuk (town; Plzeň-South)
Nepomuk (Příbram)
Nepomyšl (market town; Louny)
Neprobylice (Kladno)
Nepřevázka (Mladá Boleslav)
Neratov (Pardubice)
Neratovice (town; Mělník)
Nerestce (Písek)
Neslovice (Brno-Country)
Nesovice (Vyškov)
Nespeky (Benešov)
Nestrašovice (Příbram)
Nesuchyně (Rakovník)
Nesvačilka (Brno-Country)
Nesvačily (Beroun)
Netín (Žďár nad Sázavou)
Netolice (town; Prachatice)
Netřebice (Český Krumlov)
Netřebice (Nymburk)
Netunice (Plzeň-South)
Netvořice (market town; Benešov)
Neubuz (Zlín)
Neuměř (Plzeň-South)
Neuměřice (Kladno)
Neumětely (Beroun)
Neurazy (Plzeň-South)
Neustupov (market town; Benešov)
Nevcehle (Jihlava)
Neveklov (town; Benešov)
Neveklovice (Mladá Boleslav)
Nevězice (Písek)
Nevid (Rokycany)
Nevojice (Vyškov)
Nevolice (Domažlice)
Nevratice (Jičín)
Nevřeň (Plzeň-North)
Nezabudice (Rakovník)
Nezabylice (Chomutov)
Nezamyslice (Klatovy)
Nezamyslice (market town; Prostějov)
Nezbavětice (Plzeň-City)
Nezdenice (Uherské Hradiště)
Nezdice na Šumavě (Klatovy)
Nezdice (Klatovy)
Nezdřev (Plzeň-South)
Nezvěstice (Plzeň-City)
Nicov (Prachatice)
Nihošovice (Strakonice)
Níhov (Brno-Country)
Nikolčice (Břeclav)
Niměřice (Mladá Boleslav)
Nimpšov (Třebíč)
Nišovice (Strakonice)
Nítkovice (Kroměříž)
Niva (Prostějov)
Nivnice (Uherské Hradiště)
Nižbor (Beroun)
Nížkov (Žďár nad Sázavou)
Nížkovice (Vyškov)
Nižní Lhoty (Frýdek-Místek)
Norberčany (Olomouc)
Nosálov (Mělník)
Nosislav (market town; Brno-Country)
Nošovice (Frýdek-Místek)
Nová Buková (Pelhřimov)
Nová Bystřice (town; Jindřichův Hradec)
Nová Cerekev (market town; Pelhřimov)
Nová Dědina (Kroměříž)
Nová Hradečná (Olomouc)
Nová Lhota (Hodonín)
Nová Olešná (Jindřichův Hradec)
Nová Paka (town; Jičín)
Nová Pec (Prachatice)
Nová Pláň (Bruntál)
Nová Říše (market town; Jihlava)
Nová Role (town; Karlovy Vary)
Nová Sídla (Svitavy)
Nová Telib (Mladá Boleslav)
Nová Včelnice (town; Jindřichův Hradec)
Nová Ves (Brno-Country)
Nová Ves (České Budějovice)
Nová Ves (Český Krumlov)
Nová Ves (Domažlice)
Nová Ves (Liberec)
Nová Ves (Louny)
Nová Ves (Mělník)
Nová Ves (Plzeň-South)
Nová Ves (Prague-East)
Nová Ves (Rychnov nad Kněžnou)
Nová Ves (Sokolov)
Nová Ves (Strakonice)
Nová Ves (Třebíč)
Nová Ves (Žďár nad Sázavou)
Nová Ves I (Kolín)
Nová Ves nad Lužnicí (Jindřichův Hradec)
Nová Ves nad Nisou (Jablonec nad Nisou)
Nová Ves nad Popelkou (Semily)
Nová Ves pod Pleší (Příbram)
Nová Ves u Bakova (Mladá Boleslav)
Nová Ves u Chotěboře (Havlíčkův Brod)
Nová Ves u Chýnova (Tábor)
Nová Ves u Jarošova (Svitavy)
Nová Ves u Leštiny (Havlíčkův Brod)
Nová Ves u Mladé Vožice (Tábor)
Nová Ves u Nového Města na Moravě (Žďár nad Sázavou)
Nová Ves u Světlé (Havlíčkův Brod)
Nová Ves v Horách (Most)
Nové Bránice (Brno-Country)
Nové Dvory (market town; Kutná Hora)
Nové Dvory (Litoměřice)
Nové Dvory (Příbram)
Nové Dvory (Žďár nad Sázavou)
Nové Hamry (Karlovy Vary)
Nové Heřminovy (Bruntál)
Nové Hrady (town; České Budějovice)
Nové Hrady (Chrudim)
Nové Hutě (Prachatice)
Nové Lublice (Opava)
Nové Město na Moravě (town; Žďár nad Sázavou)
Nové Město nad Metují (town; Náchod)
Nové Město pod Smrkem (town; Liberec)
Nové Město (Hradec Králové)
Nové Mitrovice (Plzeň-South)
Nové Sady (Vyškov)
Nové Sady (Žďár nad Sázavou)
Nové Sedlice (Opava)
Nové Sedlo (Louny)
Nové Sedlo (town; Sokolov)
Nové Strašecí (town; Rakovník)
Nové Syrovice (Třebíč)
Nové Veselí (market town; Žďár nad Sázavou)
Noviny pod Ralskem (Česká Lípa)
Novosedlice (Teplice)
Novosedly (Břeclav)
Novosedly (Strakonice)
Novosedly nad Nežárkou (Jindřichův Hradec)
Nový Bor (town; Česká Lípa)
Nový Bydžov (town; Hradec Králové)
Nový Dům (Rakovník)
Nový Dvůr (Nymburk)
Nový Hrádek (market town; Náchod)
Nový Hrozenkov (market town; Vsetín)
Nový Jáchymov (Beroun)
Nový Jičín (town; Nový Jičín)
Nový Jimramov (Žďár nad Sázavou)
Nový Knín (town; Příbram)
Nový Kostel (Cheb)
Nový Kramolín (Domažlice)
Nový Malín (Šumperk)
Nový Oldřichov (Česká Lípa)
Nový Ples (Náchod)
Nový Poddvorov (Hodonín)
Nový Přerov (Břeclav)
Nový Rychnov (market town; Pelhřimov)
Nový Šaldorf-Sedlešovice (Znojmo)
Nový Telečkov (Třebíč)
Nový Vestec (Prague-East)
Nučice (Prague-East)
Nučice (Prague-West)
Nupaky (Prague-East)
Nýdek (Frýdek-Místek)
Nyklovice (Žďár nad Sázavou)
Nymburk (town; Nymburk)
Nýřany (town; Plzeň-North)
Nýrov (Blansko)
Nýrsko (town; Klatovy)

O

Občov (Příbram)
Obecnice (Příbram)
Obědkovice (Prostějov)
Obědovice (Hradec Králové)
Obora (Blansko)
Obora (Louny)
Obora (Plzeň-North)
Obora (Tachov)
Oborná (Bruntál)
Obory (Příbram)
Obořiště (Příbram)
Obrataň (Pelhřimov)
Obříství (Mělník)
Obrnice (Most)
Obrubce (Mladá Boleslav)
Obruby (Mladá Boleslav)
Obyčtov (Žďár nad Sázavou)
Obytce (Klatovy)
Očelice (Rychnov nad Kněžnou)
Ochoz u Brna (Brno-Country)
Ochoz u Tišnova (Brno-Country)
Ochoz (Prostějov)
Očihov (Louny)
Ocmanice (Třebíč)
Odolena Voda (town; Prague-East)
Odrava (Cheb)
Odrovice (Brno-Country)
Odry (town; Nový Jičín)
Odřepsy (Nymburk)
Odunec (Třebíč)
Ohaře (Kolín)
Ohařice (Jičín)
Ohaveč (Jičín)
Ohníč (Teplice)
Ohnišov (Rychnov nad Kněžnou)
Ohnišťany (Hradec Králové)
Ohrazenice (Příbram)
Ohrazenice (Semily)
Ohrobec (Prague-West)
Ohrozim (Prostějov)
Okarec (Třebíč)
Okna (Česká Lípa)
Okoř (Prague-West)
Okounov (Chomutov)
Okrouhlá (Blansko)
Okrouhlá (Česká Lípa)
Okrouhlá (Cheb)
Okrouhlá (Písek)
Okrouhlá Radouň (Jindřichův Hradec)
Okrouhlice (Havlíčkův Brod)
Okrouhlička (Havlíčkův Brod)
Okrouhlo (Prague-West)
Okřesaneč (Kutná Hora)
Okřešice (Třebíč)
Okřínek (Nymburk)
Okříšky (market town; Třebíč)
Olbramice (Olomouc)
Olbramice (Ostrava-City)
Olbramkostel (market town; Znojmo)
Olbramov (Tachov)
Olbramovice (Benešov)
Olbramovice (market town; Znojmo)
Oldřichov (Přerov)
Oldřichov (Tábor)
Oldřichov v Hájích (Liberec)
Oldřichovice (Zlín)
Oldřiš (Svitavy)
Oldřišov (Opava)
Oleksovice (market town; Znojmo)
Olešenka (Havlíčkův Brod)
Oleška (Kolín)
Oleško (Litoměřice)
Olešná (Beroun)
Olešná (Havlíčkův Brod)
Olešná (Pelhřimov)
Olešná (Písek)
Olešná (Rakovník)
Olešnice (town; Blansko)
Olešnice (České Budějovice)
Olešnice (Hradec Králové)
Olešnice (Rychnov nad Kněžnou)
Olešnice (Semily)
Olešnice v Orlických horách (Rychnov nad Kněžnou)
Olešník (České Budějovice)
Olomouc (city; Olomouc)
Olomučany (Blansko)
Oloví (town; Sokolov)
Olovnice (Kladno)
Olšany (Jihlava)
Olšany (Klatovy)
Olšany (Šumperk)
Olšany (Vyškov)
Olšany u Prostějova (Prostějov)
Olší (Brno-Country)
Olší (Jihlava)
Olšovec (Přerov)
Olšovice (Prachatice)
Omice (Brno-Country)
Omlenice (Český Krumlov)
Ondratice (Prostějov)
Ondřejov (Pelhřimov)
Ondřejov (Prague-East)
Onomyšl (Kutná Hora)
Onšov (Pelhřimov)
Onšov (Znojmo)
Opařany (Tábor)
Opatov (Jihlava)
Opatov (Svitavy)
Opatov (market town; Třebíč)
Opatovec (Svitavy)
Opatovice (Brno-Country)
Opatovice (Přerov)
Opatovice I (Kutná Hora)
Opatovice nad Labem (Pardubice)
Opava (city; Opava)
Oplany (Kolín)
Oplocany (Přerov)
Oplot (Plzeň-South)
Opočnice (Nymburk)
Opočno (Louny)
Opočno (town; Rychnov nad Kněžnou)
Opolany (Nymburk)
Oponešice (Třebíč)
Oprostovice (Přerov)
Oráčov (Rakovník)
Orel (Chrudim)
Orlické Podhůří (Ústí nad Orlicí)
Orlické Záhoří (Rychnov nad Kněžnou)
Orličky (Ústí nad Orlicí)
Orlík nad Vltavou (Písek)
Orlová (town; Karviná)
Orlovice (Vyškov)
Ořech (Prague-West)
Ořechov (Brno-Country)
Ořechov (Jihlava)
Ořechov (Uherské Hradiště)
Ořechov (Žďár nad Sázavou)
Osečany (Příbram)
Oseček (Nymburk)
Osečná (town; Liberec)
Osečnice (Rychnov nad Kněžnou)
Osek (Beroun)
Osek (Jičín)
Osek (Písek)
Osek (Rokycany)
Osek (Strakonice)
Osek (town; Teplice)
Osek nad Bečvou (Přerov)
Oselce (Plzeň-South)
Osice (Hradec Králové)
Osíčko (Kroměříž)
Osičky (Hradec Králové)
Osík (Svitavy)
Osiky (Brno-Country)
Oskava (Šumperk)
Oskořínek (Nymburk)
Oslavany (town; Brno-Country)
Oslavice (Žďár nad Sázavou)
Oslavička (Třebíč)
Oslnovice (Znojmo)
Oslov (Písek)
Osoblaha (Bruntál)
Osov (Beroun)
Osová Bítýška (Žďár nad Sázavou)
Osové (Žďár nad Sázavou)
Ostašov (Třebíč)
Ostopovice (Brno-Country)
Ostrá (Nymburk)
Ostrata (Zlín)
Ostrava (city; Ostrava-City)
Ostravice (Frýdek-Místek)
Ostrolovský Újezd (České Budějovice)
Ostroměř (Jičín)
Ostrov (Benešov)
Ostrov (Havlíčkův Brod)
Ostrov (Chrudim)
Ostrov (town; Karlovy Vary)
Ostrov (Příbram)
Ostrov (Ústí nad Orlicí)
Ostrov nad Oslavou (market town; Žďár nad Sázavou)
Ostrov u Bezdružic (Plzeň-North)
Ostrov u Macochy (market town; Blansko)
Ostrovačice (market town; Brno-Country)
Ostrovánky (Hodonín)
Ostrovec-Lhotka (Rokycany)
Ostrovec (Písek)
Ostrožská Lhota (Uherské Hradiště)
Ostrožská Nová Ves (Uherské Hradiště)
Ostružná (Jeseník)
Ostružno (Jičín)
Ostředek (Benešov)
Ostřešany (Pardubice)
Ostřetice (Klatovy)
Ostřetín (Pardubice)
Osvětimany (market town; Uherské Hradiště)
Osvračín (Domažlice)
Ošelín (Tachov)
Otaslavice (Prostějov)
Otěšice (Plzeň-South)
Otice (Opava)
Otín (Jihlava)
Otín (Žďár nad Sázavou)
Otinoves (Prostějov)
Otmarov (Brno-Country)
Otmíče (Beroun)
Otnice (Vyškov)
Otov (Domažlice)
Otovice (Karlovy Vary)
Otovice (Náchod)
Otradov (Chrudim)
Otročín (Karlovy Vary)
Otročiněves (Beroun)
Otrokovice (town; Zlín)
Otvice (Chomutov)
Otvovice (Kladno)
Ouběnice (Příbram)
Oucmanice (Ústí nad Orlicí)
Oudoleň (Havlíčkův Brod)
Ovčáry (Kolín)
Ovčáry (Mělník)
Ovesná Lhota (Havlíčkův Brod)
Ovesné Kladruby (Cheb)
Oznice (Vsetín)

P

Paběnice (Kutná Hora)
Pačejov (Klatovy)
Paceřice (Liberec)
Pacetluky (Kroměříž)
Pačlavice (Kroměříž)
Pacov (town; Pelhřimov)
Páleč (Kladno)
Palkovice (Frýdek-Místek)
Palonín (Šumperk)
Pálovice (Třebíč)
Pamětice (Blansko)
Panenská Rozsíčka (Jihlava)
Panenské Břežany (Prague-East)
Panenský Týnec (market town; Louny)
Panoší Újezd (Rakovník)
Panské Dubenky (Jihlava)
Paračov (Strakonice)
Pardubice (city; Pardubice)
Paršovice (Přerov)
Partutovice (Přerov)
Pařezov (Domažlice)
Pasečnice (Domažlice)
Paseka (Olomouc)
Paseky (Písek)
Paseky nad Jizerou (Semily)
Pašinka (Kolín)
Paskov (town; Frýdek-Místek)
Pasohlávky (Brno-Country)
Pašovice (Uherské Hradiště)
Pastuchovice (Plzeň-North)
Pastviny (Ústí nad Orlicí)
Pátek (Nymburk)
Patokryje (Most)
Pavlice (Znojmo)
Pavlíkov (market town; Rakovník)
Pavlínov (Žďár nad Sázavou)
Pavlov (Břeclav)
Pavlov (Havlíčkův Brod)
Pavlov (Jihlava)
Pavlov (Kladno)
Pavlov (Pelhřimov)
Pavlov (Šumperk)
Pavlov (Žďár nad Sázavou)
Pavlovice (Benešov)
Pavlovice u Kojetína (Prostějov)
Pavlovice u Přerova (Přerov)
Pazderna (Frýdek-Místek)
Pchery (Kladno)
Pec (Domažlice)
Peč (Jindřichův Hradec)
Pec pod Sněžkou (town; Trutnov)
Pěčice (Mladá Boleslav)
Pečice (Příbram)
Pěčín (Rychnov nad Kněžnou)
Pecka (market town; Jičín)
Pečky (town; Kolín)
Pěčnov (Prachatice)
Pelechy (Domažlice)
Pelhřimov (town; Pelhřimov)
Pěnčín (Jablonec nad Nisou)
Pěnčín (Liberec)
Pěnčín (Prostějov)
Perálec (Chrudim)
Peřimov (Semily)
Perná (Břeclav)
Pernarec (Plzeň-North)
Pernink (Karlovy Vary)
Pernštejnské Jestřabí (Brno-Country)
Perštejn (Chomutov)
Pertoltice (Kutná Hora)
Pertoltice (Liberec)
Pertoltice pod Ralskem (Česká Lípa)
Peruc (market town; Louny)
Pesvice (Chomutov)
Pětihosty (Prague-East)
Pětikozly (Mladá Boleslav)
Pětipsy (Chomutov)
Petkovy (Mladá Boleslav)
Petráveč (Žďár nad Sázavou)
Petříkov (České Budějovice)
Petříkov (Prague-East)
Petrohrad (Louny)
Petroupim (Benešov)
Petrov (Blansko)
Petrov (Hodonín)
Petrov (Prague-West)
Petrovice (Blansko)
Petrovice (Bruntál)
Petrovice (Hradec Králové)
Petrovice (Příbram)
Petrovice (Rakovník)
Petrovice (Třebíč)
Petrovice (Ústí nad Labem)
Petrovice (Ústí nad Orlicí)
Petrovice (Znojmo)
Petrovice I (Kutná Hora)
Petrovice II (Kutná Hora)
Petrovice u Karviné (Karviná)
Petrovice u Sušice (Klatovy)
Petrovičky (Jičín)
Petrůvka (Zlín)
Petrůvky (Třebíč)
Petřvald (town; Karviná)
Petřvald (Nový Jičín)
Pičín (Příbram)
Pikárec (Žďár nad Sázavou)
Pila (Karlovy Vary)
Pilníkov (town; Trutnov)
Písařov (Šumperk)
Písečná (Frýdek-Místek)
Písečná (Jeseník)
Písečná (Ústí nad Orlicí)
Písečné (Jindřichův Hradec)
Písečné (Žďár nad Sázavou)
Písek (Frýdek-Místek)
Písek (Hradec Králové)
Písek (town; Písek)
Písková Lhota (Mladá Boleslav)
Písková Lhota (Nymburk)
Píšť (Opava)
Píšť (Pelhřimov)
Píšťany (Litoměřice)
Pištín (České Budějovice)
Pístina (Jindřichův Hradec)
Písty (Nymburk)
Pitín (Uherské Hradiště)
Pivín (Prostějov)
Pivkovice (Strakonice)
Planá (České Budějovice)
Planá (town; Tachov)
Planá nad Lužnicí (town; Tábor)
Plaňany (market town; Kolín)
Plandry (Jihlava)
Pláně (Plzeň-North)
Plánice (town; Klatovy)
Plasy (town; Plzeň-North)
Plav (České Budějovice)
Plaveč (Znojmo)
Plavsko (Jindřichův Hradec)
Plavy (Jablonec nad Nisou)
Plazy (Mladá Boleslav)
Plenkovice (Znojmo)
Plesná (town; Cheb)
Pleše (Jindřichův Hradec)
Plešnice (Plzeň-North)
Pletený Újezd (Kladno)
Plch (Pardubice)
Plchov (Kladno)
Plchovice (Ústí nad Orlicí)
Plískov (Rokycany)
Ploskovice (Litoměřice)
Pluhův Žďár (Jindřichův Hradec)
Plumlov (town; Prostějov)
Plužná (Mladá Boleslav)
Plzeň (city; Plzeň-City)
Pnětluky (Louny)
Pňov-Předhradí (Nymburk)
Pňovany (Plzeň-North)
Pňovice (Olomouc)
Poběžovice (town; Domažlice)
Poběžovice u Holic (Pardubice)
Poběžovice u Přelouče (Pardubice)
Počaply (Příbram)
Počátky (town; Pelhřimov)
Počedělice (Louny)
Počenice-Tetětice (Kroměříž)
Počepice (Příbram)
Pocinovice (Domažlice)
Počítky (Žďár nad Sázavou)
Podbořanský Rohozec (Louny)
Podbořany (town; Louny)
Podbrdy (Beroun)
Podbřezí (Rychnov nad Kněžnou)
Podbřežice (Vyškov)
Poděbrady (town; Nymburk)
Poděšín (Žďár nad Sázavou)
Poděvousy (Domažlice)
Podhořany u Ronova (Chrudim)
Podhorní Újezd a Vojice (Jičín)
Podhradí (Cheb)
Podhradí (market town; Jičín)
Podhradí (Zlín)
Podhradí nad Dyjí (Znojmo)
Podhradní Lhota (Kroměříž)
Podivice (Vyškov)
Podivín (town; Břeclav)
Podkopná Lhota (Zlín)
Podlesí (Příbram)
Podlesí (Ústí nad Orlicí)
Podlešín (Kladno)
Podluhy (Beroun)
Podmoklany (Havlíčkův Brod)
Podmokly (Klatovy)
Podmokly (Rokycany)
Podmoky (Havlíčkův Brod)
Podmoky (Nymburk)
Podmolí (Znojmo)
Podmyče (Znojmo)
Podolanka (Prague-East)
Podolí (Brno-Country)
Podolí (Přerov)
Podolí (Uherské Hradiště)
Podolí (Vsetín)
Podolí (Žďár nad Sázavou)
Podolí I (Písek)
Podomí (Vyškov)
Podsedice (Litoměřice)
Podůlšany (Pardubice)
Podůlší (Jičín)
Podveky (Kutná Hora)
Pohled (Havlíčkův Brod)
Pohleď (Havlíčkův Brod)
Pohledy (Svitavy)
Pohnánec (Tábor)
Pohnání (Tábor)
Pohořelice (town; Brno-Country)
Pohořelice (Zlín)
Pohorovice (Strakonice)
Pohorská Ves (Český Krumlov)
Pohoří (Prague-West)
Pohoří (Rychnov nad Kněžnou)
Pochvalov (Rakovník)
Pojbuky (Tábor)
Pokojov (Žďár nad Sázavou)
Pokojovice (Třebíč)
Pokřikov (Chrudim)
Polánka (Plzeň-South)
Poleň (Klatovy)
Polepy (Kolín)
Polepy (Litoměřice)
Polerady (Most)
Polerady (Prague-East)
Polesí (Pelhřimov)
Polešovice (market town; Uherské Hradiště)
Polevsko (Česká Lípa)
Police (Šumperk)
Police (Třebíč)
Police (Vsetín)
Police nad Metují (town; Náchod)
Polička (town; Svitavy)
Polkovice (Přerov)
Polná (town; Jihlava)
Polní Chrčice (Kolín)
Polní Voděrady (Kolín)
Polnička (Žďár nad Sázavou)
Polom (Přerov)
Polom (Rychnov nad Kněžnou)
Polomí (Prostějov)
Polště (Jindřichův Hradec)
Pomezí nad Ohří (Cheb)
Pomezí (Svitavy)
Ponědraž (Jindřichův Hradec)
Ponědrážka (Jindřichův Hradec)
Ponětovice (Brno-Country)
Poniklá (Semily)
Popelín (Jindřichův Hradec)
Popice (Břeclav)
Popovice (Benešov)
Popovice (Brno-Country)
Popovice (Uherské Hradiště)
Popovičky (Prague-East)
Popůvky (Brno-Country)
Popůvky (Třebíč)
Poříčany (Kolín)
Poříčí nad Sázavou (Benešov)
Poříčí u Litomyšle (Svitavy)
Pošná (Pelhřimov)
Postoloprty (town; Louny)
Poštovice (Kladno)
Postřekov (Domažlice)
Postřelmov (Šumperk)
Postřelmůvek (Šumperk)
Postřižín (Prague-East)
Postupice (Benešov)
Poteč (Zlín)
Potěhy (Kutná Hora)
Potštát (town; Přerov)
Potštejn (Rychnov nad Kněžnou)
Potůčky (Karlovy Vary)
Potvorov (Plzeň-North)
Poustka (Cheb)
Pouzdřany (Břeclav)
Povrly (Ústí nad Labem)
Pozďatín (Třebíč)
Pozděchov (Vsetín)
Pozdeň (Kladno)
Pozlovice (market town; Zlín)
Pozořice (market town; Brno-Country)
Prace (Brno-Country)
Práče (Znojmo)
Pracejovice (Strakonice)
Prackovice nad Labem (Litoměřice)
Prádlo (Plzeň-South)
Prachatice (town; Prachatice)
Prachovice (Chrudim)
Praha (capital city; special status)
Prakšice (Uherské Hradiště)
Prameny (Cheb)
Prasek (Hradec Králové)
Praskačka (Hradec Králové)
Prasklice (Kroměříž)
Praskolesy (Beroun)
Prášily (Klatovy)
Přáslavice (Olomouc)
Pravčice (Kroměříž)
Pravice (Znojmo)
Pravlov (Brno-Country)
Pravonín (Benešov)
Pravy (Pardubice)
Pražmo (Frýdek-Místek)
Přeborov (Písek)
Přebuz (town; Sokolov)
Přechovice (Strakonice)
Přeckov (Třebíč)
Předboj (Prague-East)
Předenice (Plzeň-South)
Předhradí (Chrudim)
Předín (Třebíč)
Předklášteří (Brno-Country)
Předměřice nad Jizerou (Mladá Boleslav)
Předměřice nad Labem (Hradec Králové)
Předmíř (Strakonice)
Přední Výtoň (Český Krumlov)
Přední Zborovice (Strakonice)
Předotice (Písek)
Předslav (Klatovy)
Předslavice (Strakonice)
Přehořov (Tábor)
Přehvozdí (Kolín)
Přehýšov (Plzeň-North)
Přelíc (Kladno)
Přelouč (town; Pardubice)
Přelovice (Pardubice)
Přemyslovice (Prostějov)
Přepeře (Mladá Boleslav)
Přepeře (Semily)
Přepychy (Pardubice)
Přepychy (Rychnov nad Kněžnou)
Přerov nad Labem (Nymburk)
Přerov (city; Přerov)
Přerubenice (Rakovník)
Přeskače (Znojmo)
Přestanov (Ústí nad Labem)
Přestavlky (Chrudim)
Přestavlky (Litoměřice)
Přestavlky (Plzeň-South)
Přestavlky (Přerov)
Přestavlky u Čerčan (Benešov)
Přešovice (Třebíč)
Přeštěnice (Písek)
Přeštice (town; Plzeň-South)
Přešťovice (Strakonice)
Převýšov (Hradec Králové)
Přezletice (Prague-East)
Přibice (Brno-Country)
Příbor (town; Nový Jičín)
Příbram (town; Příbram)
Příbram na Moravě (Brno-Country)
Příbraz (Jindřichův Hradec)
Přibyslav (town; Havlíčkův Brod)
Přibyslav (Náchod)
Přibyslavice (Brno-Country)
Přibyslavice (Třebíč)
Příchovice (Plzeň-South)
Příčina (Rakovník)
Příčovy (Příbram)
Přídolí (market town; Český Krumlov)
Příkazy (Olomouc)
Příkosice (Rokycany)
Příkrý (Semily)
Přílepy (Kroměříž)
Přílepy (Rakovník)
Příluka (Svitavy)
Přimda (town; Tachov)
Přísečná (Český Krumlov)
Příseka (Havlíčkův Brod)
Přísnotice (Brno-Country)
Přistoupim (Kolín)
Přišimasy (Kolín)
Příšov (Plzeň-North)
Příšovice (Liberec)
Příštpo (Třebíč)
Přítluky (Břeclav)
Přívětice (Rokycany)
Přívrat (Ústí nad Orlicí)
Prlov (Vsetín)
Proboštov (Teplice)
Probulov (Písek)
Prodašice (Mladá Boleslav)
Prokopov (Znojmo)
Proruby (Rychnov nad Kněžnou)
Proseč (town; Chrudim)
Proseč (Pelhřimov)
Proseč pod Ještědem (Liberec)
Proseč pod Křemešníkem (Pelhřimov)
Prosečné (Trutnov)
Prosenice (Přerov)
Prosenická Lhota (Příbram)
Prosetín (Chrudim)
Prosetín (Žďár nad Sázavou)
Prosíčka (Havlíčkův Brod)
Prosiměřice (market town; Znojmo)
Prostějov (city; Prostějov)
Prostějovičky (Prostějov)
Prostiboř (Tachov)
Prostřední Bečva (Vsetín)
Prostřední Poříčí (Blansko)
Protivanov (market town; Prostějov)
Protivín (town; Písek)
Provodín (Česká Lípa)
Provodov-Šonov (Náchod)
Provodov (Zlín)
Provodovice (Přerov)
Prštice (Brno-Country)
Průhonice (Prague-West)
Prušánky (Hodonín)
Prusice (Kolín)
Prusinovice (Kroměříž)
Prusy-Boškůvky (Vyškov)
Prysk (Česká Lípa)
Pržno (Frýdek-Místek)
Pržno (Vsetín)
Pšánky (Hradec Králové)
Psárov (Tábor)
Psáry (Prague-West)
Psáře (Benešov)
Pšov (Karlovy Vary)
Pšovlky (Rakovník)
Pstruží (Frýdek-Místek)
Ptení (Prostějov)
Ptenín (Plzeň-South)
Ptice (Prague-West)
Ptýrov (Mladá Boleslav)
Puclice (Domažlice)
Pucov (Třebíč)
Puchlovice (Hradec Králové)
Puklice (Jihlava)
Pulečný (Jablonec nad Nisou)
Pustá Kamenice (Svitavy)
Pustá Polom (Opava)
Pustá Rybná (Svitavy)
Pustějov (Nový Jičín)
Pustiměř (Vyškov)
Pustina (Ústí nad Orlicí)
Pustověty (Rakovník)
Putim (Písek)
Putimov (Pelhřimov)
Pyšel (Třebíč)
Pyšely (town; Benešov)

R

Rabakov (Mladá Boleslav)
Rabí (town; Klatovy)
Rabštejnská Lhota (Chrudim)
Ráby (Pardubice)
Rabyně (Benešov)
Racková (Zlín)
Rácovice (Třebíč)
Račetice (Chomutov)
Račice (Litoměřice)
Račice (Rakovník)
Račice (Třebíč)
Račice (Žďár nad Sázavou)
Račice-Pístovice (Vyškov)
Račice nad Trotinou (Hradec Králové)
Račín (Žďár nad Sázavou)
Račiněves (Litoměřice)
Radčice (Jablonec nad Nisou)
Radějov (Hodonín)
Radějovice (Prague-East)
Radějovice (Strakonice)
Radenice (Žďár nad Sázavou)
Radenín (Tábor)
Radešín (Žďár nad Sázavou)
Radešínská Svratka (Žďár nad Sázavou)
Radětice (Příbram)
Radětice (Tábor)
Radhostice (Prachatice)
Radhošť (Ústí nad Orlicí)
Radíč (Příbram)
Radíkov (Přerov)
Radíkovice (Hradec Králové)
Radim (Jičín)
Radim (Kolín)
Radiměř (market town; Svitavy)
Radimovice (Liberec)
Radimovice u Tábora (Tábor)
Radimovice u Želče (Tábor)
Radkov (Jihlava)
Radkov (Opava)
Radkov (Svitavy)
Radkov (Tábor)
Radkov (Žďár nad Sázavou)
Radkova Lhota (Přerov)
Radkovice (Plzeň-South)
Radkovice u Budče (Třebíč)
Radkovice u Hrotovic (Třebíč)
Radkovy (Přerov)
Rádlo (Jablonec nad Nisou)
Radnice (town; Rokycany)
Radňoves (Žďár nad Sázavou)
Radňovice (Žďár nad Sázavou)
Radomyšl (market town; Strakonice)
Radonice (Chomutov)
Radonice (Prague-East)
Radonín (Třebíč)
Radostice (Brno-Country)
Radostín (Havlíčkův Brod)
Radostín (Žďár nad Sázavou)
Radostín nad Oslavou (market town; Žďár nad Sázavou)
Radostná pod Kozákovem (Semily)
Radostov (Hradec Králové)
Radošov (Třebíč)
Radošovice (Benešov)
Radošovice (České Budějovice)
Radošovice (Strakonice)
Radotice (Třebíč)
Radotín (Přerov)
Radovesice (Litoměřice)
Radovesnice I (Kolín)
Radovesnice II (Kolín)
Radslavice (Přerov)
Radslavice (Vyškov)
Raduň (Opava)
Radvanec (Česká Lípa)
Radvanice (Přerov)
Radvanice (Trutnov)
Rájec (Šumperk)
Rájec-Jestřebí (town; Blansko)
Ráječko (Blansko)
Rajhrad (town; Brno-Country)
Rajhradice (Brno-Country)
Rajnochovice (Kroměříž)
Rakousy (Semily)
Rakov (Přerov)
Raková u Konice (Prostějov)
Raková (Rokycany)
Rakovice (Písek)
Rakovník (town; Rakovník)
Rakůvka (Prostějov)
Rakvice (Břeclav)
Ralsko (town; Česká Lípa)
Raná (Chrudim)
Raná (Louny)
Rančířov (Jihlava)
Rantířov (Jihlava)
Rapotice (Třebíč)
Rapotín (Šumperk)
Rapšach (Jindřichův Hradec)
Rašín (Jičín)
Raškovice (Frýdek-Místek)
Řásná (Jihlava)
Rasošky (Náchod)
Rašov (Brno-Country)
Rašovice (Kutná Hora)
Rašovice (Vyškov)
Raspenava (town; Liberec)
Rataje (Benešov)
Rataje (Kroměříž)
Rataje (Tábor)
Rataje nad Sázavou (market town; Kutná Hora)
Ratboř (Kolín)
Ratenice (Kolín)
Ratiboř (Jindřichův Hradec)
Ratiboř (Vsetín)
Ratibořské Hory (Tábor)
Ratíškovice (Hodonín)
Ratměřice (Benešov)
Razová (Bruntál)
Ražice (Písek)
Rebešovice (Brno-Country)
Řečany nad Labem (Pardubice)
Řečice (Pelhřimov)
Řečice (Žďár nad Sázavou)
Řehenice (Prague-East)
Řehlovice (Ústí nad Labem)
Rejchartice (Šumperk)
Rejštejn (town; Klatovy)
Řeka (Frýdek-Místek)
Řemíčov (Tábor)
Řenče (Plzeň-South)
Řendějov (Kutná Hora)
Řepeč (Tábor)
Řepice (Strakonice)
Řepín (Mělník)
Řepiště (Frýdek-Místek)
Řepníky (Ústí nad Orlicí)
Řepov (Mladá Boleslav)
Řeřichy (Rakovník)
Rešice (Znojmo)
Řestoky (Chrudim)
Řetová (Ústí nad Orlicí)
Řetůvka (Ústí nad Orlicí)
Řevnice (town; Prague-West)
Řevničov (Rakovník)
Řícmanice (Brno-Country)
Říčany (Brno-Country)
Říčany (town; Prague-East)
Říčky (Brno-Country)
Říčky v Orlických horách (Rychnov nad Kněžnou)
Řídeč (Olomouc)
Řídelov (Jihlava)
Řídký (Svitavy)
Řikonín (Brno-Country)
Říkov (Náchod)
Říkovice (Přerov)
Římov (České Budějovice)
Římov (Třebíč)
Řimovice (Benešov)
Řípec (Tábor)
Řisuty (Kladno)
Řitka (Prague-West)
Řitonice (Mladá Boleslav)
Roblín (Prague-West)
Ročov (market town; Louny)
Rodinov (Pelhřimov)
Rodkov (Žďár nad Sázavou)
Rodná (Tábor)
Rodvínov (Jindřichův Hradec)
Rohatec (Hodonín)
Rohatsko (Mladá Boleslav)
Rohenice (Rychnov nad Kněžnou)
Rohle (Šumperk)
Rohov (Opava)
Rohovládova Bělá (Pardubice)
Rohozec (Brno-Country)
Rohozec (Kutná Hora)
Rohozná (Jihlava)
Rohozná (Svitavy)
Rohoznice (Jičín)
Rohoznice (Pardubice)
Rohy (Třebíč)
Rochlov (Plzeň-North)
Rochov (Litoměřice)
Rojetín (Brno-Country)
Rokle (Chomutov)
Rokycany (town; Rokycany)
Rokytá (Mladá Boleslav)
Rokytňany (Jičín)
Rokytnice (Přerov)
Rokytnice (Zlín)
Rokytnice nad Jizerou (town; Semily)
Rokytnice nad Rokytnou (market town; Třebíč)
Rokytnice v Orlických horách (town; Rychnov nad Kněžnou)
Rokytno (Pardubice)
Rokytovec (Mladá Boleslav)
Ronov nad Doubravou (town; Chrudim)
Ropice (Frýdek-Místek)
Roprachtice (Semily)
Roseč (Jindřichův Hradec)
Rosice (town; Brno-Country)
Rosice (Chrudim)
Rosička (Jindřichův Hradec)
Rosička (Žďár nad Sázavou)
Rosovice (Příbram)
Rostěnice-Zvonovice (Vyškov)
Rostoklaty (Kolín)
Roštění (Kroměříž)
Roštín (Kroměříž)
Rotava (town; Sokolov)
Roubanina (Blansko)
Roudná (Tábor)
Roudné (České Budějovice)
Roudnice nad Labem (town; Litoměřice)
Roudnice (Hradec Králové)
Roudno (Bruntál)
Rouchovany (Třebíč)
Roupov (Plzeň-South)
Rousínov (town; Vyškov)
Rouské (Přerov)
Rousměrov (Žďár nad Sázavou)
Rovečné (Žďár nad Sázavou)
Rovensko (Šumperk)
Rovensko pod Troskami (town; Semily)
Rovná (Pelhřimov)
Rovná (Sokolov)
Rovná (Strakonice)
Rožďalovice (town; Nymburk)
Rozdrojovice (Brno-Country)
Rozhovice (Chrudim)
Rozhraní (Svitavy)
Rozkoš (Znojmo)
Rožmberk nad Vltavou (town; Český Krumlov)
Rožmitál na Šumavě (Český Krumlov)
Rožmitál pod Třemšínem (town; Příbram)
Rožná (Žďár nad Sázavou)
Rožnov pod Radhoštěm (town; Vsetín)
Rožnov (Náchod)
Rozseč (Jihlava)
Rozseč (Žďár nad Sázavou)
Rozseč nad Kunštátem (Blansko)
Rozsíčka (Blansko)
Rozsochatec (Havlíčkův Brod)
Rozsochy (Žďár nad Sázavou)
Rozstání (Prostějov)
Rozstání (Svitavy)
Roztoky (town; Prague-West)
Roztoky (Rakovník)
Roztoky u Jilemnice (Semily)
Roztoky u Semil (Semily)
Rozvadov (Tachov)
Rpety (Beroun)
Rtyně nad Bílinou (Teplice)
Rtyně v Podkrkonoší (town; Trutnov)
Ruda (Rakovník)
Ruda (Žďár nad Sázavou)
Ruda nad Moravou (Šumperk)
Rudice (Blansko)
Rudice (Uherské Hradiště)
Rudíkov (Třebíč)
Rudimov (Zlín)
Rudka (Brno-Country)
Rudlice (Znojmo)
Rudná (town; Prague-West)
Rudná (Svitavy)
Rudná pod Pradědem (Bruntál)
Rudník (Trutnov)
Rudolec (Žďár nad Sázavou)
Rudolfov (town; České Budějovice)
Rudoltice (Ústí nad Orlicí)
Rumburk (town; Děčín)
Ruprechtov (Vyškov)
Rusava (Kroměříž)
Rusín (Bruntál)
Rušinov (Havlíčkův Brod)
Růžďka (Vsetín)
Růžená (Jihlava)
Růžová (Děčín)
Rybí (Nový Jičín)
Rybitví (Pardubice)
Rybná nad Zdobnicí (Rychnov nad Kněžnou)
Rybné (Jihlava)
Rybnice (Plzeň-North)
Rybníček (Havlíčkův Brod)
Rybníček (Vyškov)
Rybník (Domažlice)
Rybník (Ústí nad Orlicí)
Rybníky (Příbram)
Rybníky (Znojmo)
Rybniště (Děčín)
Rychnov na Moravě (Svitavy)
Rychnov nad Kněžnou (town; Rychnov nad Kněžnou)
Rychnov u Jablonce nad Nisou (town; Jablonec nad Nisou)
Rychnovek (Náchod)
Rychvald (town; Karviná)
Ryjice (Ústí nad Labem)
Rýmařov (town; Bruntál)
Rymice (Kroměříž)
Rynárec (Pelhřimov)
Rynholec (Rakovník)
Rynoltice (Liberec)
Ryžoviště (Bruntál)

S

Šabina (Sokolov)
Sádek (Příbram)
Sádek (Svitavy)
Sadov (Karlovy Vary)
Sadová (Hradec Králové)
Sadská (town; Nymburk)
Šafov (Znojmo)
Šakvice (Břeclav)
Salačova Lhota (Pelhřimov)
Salaš (Uherské Hradiště)
Samopše (Kutná Hora)
Samotišky (Olomouc)
Samšín (Pelhřimov)
Samšina (Jičín)
Šanov (Rakovník)
Šanov (Zlín)
Šanov (Znojmo)
Sány (Nymburk)
Šaplava (Hradec Králové)
Šaratice (Vyškov)
Šardice (Hodonín)
Šárovcova Lhota (Jičín)
Šarovy (Zlín)
Šatov (market town; Znojmo)
Sázava (town; Benešov)
Sázava (Ústí nad Orlicí)
Sázava (Žďár nad Sázavou)
Sázavka (Havlíčkův Brod)
Sazená (Kladno)
Sazomín (Žďár nad Sázavou)
Sazovice (Zlín)
Sběř (Jičín)
Schořov (Kutná Hora)
Sebečice (Rokycany)
Šebestěnice (Kutná Hora)
Šebetov (Blansko)
Šebířov (Tábor)
Šebkovice (Třebíč)
Sebranice (Blansko)
Sebranice (Svitavy)
Šebrov-Kateřina (Blansko)
Seč (town; Chrudim)
Seč (Plzeň-South)
Seč (Ústí nad Orlicí)
Šedivec (Ústí nad Orlicí)
Sedlatice (Jihlava)
Sedlčany (town; Příbram)
Sedlec-Prčice (town; Benešov)
Sedlec (Břeclav)
Sedlec (České Budějovice)
Sedlec (Litoměřice)
Sedlec (Mladá Boleslav)
Sedlec (Plzeň-North)
Sedlec (Prague-East)
Sedlec (Třebíč)
Sedlečko u Soběslavě (Tábor)
Sedlejov (Jihlava)
Sedletín (Havlíčkův Brod)
Sedlice (Pelhřimov)
Sedlice (Příbram)
Sedlice (town; Strakonice)
Sedliště (Frýdek-Místek)
Sedliště (Jičín)
Sedliště (Plzeň-South)
Sedliště (Svitavy)
Sedlnice (Nový Jičín)
Sedloňov (Rychnov nad Kněžnou)
Sehradice (Zlín)
Sejřek (Žďár nad Sázavou)
Sekeřice (Jičín)
Šelešovice (Kroměříž)
Seletice (Nymburk)
Selmice (Pardubice)
Seloutky (Prostějov)
Semanín (Ústí nad Orlicí)
Semčice (Mladá Boleslav)
Semechnice (Rychnov nad Kněžnou)
Semice (Nymburk)
Semily (town; Semily)
Semín (Pardubice)
Semněvice (Domažlice)
Šemnice (Karlovy Vary)
Semtěš (Kutná Hora)
Sendraž (Náchod)
Sendražice (Hradec Králové)
Senec (Rakovník)
Senetářov (Blansko)
Senice na Hané (Olomouc)
Senice (Nymburk)
Senička (Olomouc)
Seninka (Vsetín)
Senohraby (Prague-East)
Senomaty (market town; Rakovník)
Senorady (Brno-Country)
Šenov (town; Ostrava-City)
Šenov u Nového Jičína (Nový Jičín)
Senožaty (Pelhřimov)
Sentice (Brno-Country)
Sepekov (market town; Písek)
Šerkovice (Brno-Country)
Šestajovice (Náchod)
Šestajovice (Prague-East)
Šetějovice (Benešov)
Ševětín (market town; České Budějovice)
Sezemice (Mladá Boleslav)
Sezemice (town; Pardubice)
Sezimovo Ústí (town; Tábor)
Sibřina (Prague-East)
Šilheřovice (Opava)
Silůvky (Brno-Country)
Šimanov (Jihlava)
Šimonovice (Liberec)
Šindelová (Sokolov)
Šípy (Rakovník)
Sirá (Rokycany)
Sirákov (Žďár nad Sázavou)
Siřejovice (Litoměřice)
Široká Niva (Bruntál)
Široký Důl (Svitavy)
Šišma (Přerov)
Šitbořice (Břeclav)
Sivice (Brno-Country)
Skalice (Hradec Králové)
Skalice (Tábor)
Skalice (Znojmo)
Skalice nad Svitavou (Blansko)
Skalice u České Lípy (Česká Lípa)
Skalička (Brno-Country)
Skalička (Přerov)
Skalka (Hodonín)
Skalka (Prostějov)
Skalka u Doks (Česká Lípa)
Skalná (town; Cheb)
Skalsko (Mladá Boleslav)
Skály (Písek)
Skály (Strakonice)
Skapce (Tachov)
Skašov (Plzeň-South)
Skaštice (Kroměříž)
Sklené (Svitavy)
Sklené (Žďár nad Sázavou)
Sklené nad Oslavou (Žďár nad Sázavou)
Skočice (Strakonice)
Skomelno (Rokycany)
Skopytce (Tábor)
Skorkov (Havlíčkův Brod)
Skorkov (Mladá Boleslav)
Skoronice (Hodonín)
Skorošice (Jeseník)
Skorotice (Žďár nad Sázavou)
Skořenice (Ústí nad Orlicí)
Skořice (Rokycany)
Skotnice (Nový Jičín)
Skrbeň (Olomouc)
Skrchov (Blansko)
Škrdlovice (Žďár nad Sázavou)
Skršín (Most)
Skrýchov u Malšic (Tábor)
Skryje (Brno-Country)
Skryje (Havlíčkův Brod)
Skryje (Rakovník)
Skřinářov (Žďár nad Sázavou)
Skřipel (Beroun)
Skřipov (Opava)
Skřípov (Prostějov)
Skřivany (Hradec Králové)
Skuhrov (Beroun)
Skuhrov (Havlíčkův Brod)
Skuhrov (Jablonec nad Nisou)
Skuhrov nad Bělou (Rychnov nad Kněžnou)
Skuteč (town; Chrudim)
Škvorec (market town; Prague-East)
Škvořetice (Strakonice)
Skvrňov (Kolín)
Slabce (market town; Rakovník)
Slabčice (Písek)
Slaná (Semily)
Slaník (Strakonice)
Slaný (town; Kladno)
Šlapanice (town; Brno-Country)
Šlapanice (Kladno)
Šlapanov (Havlíčkův Brod)
Slapsko (Tábor)
Slapy (Prague-West)
Slapy (Tábor)
Slatina (Kladno)
Slatina (Klatovy)
Slatina (Litoměřice)
Slatina (Nový Jičín)
Slatina (Plzeň-North)
Slatina (Svitavy)
Slatina (Ústí nad Orlicí)
Slatina (Znojmo)
Slatina nad Úpou (Náchod)
Slatina nad Zdobnicí (Rychnov nad Kněžnou)
Slatiňany (town; Chrudim)
Slatinice (Olomouc)
Slatinky (Prostějov)
Slatiny (Jičín)
Slavče (České Budějovice)
Slavětice (Třebíč)
Slavětín (Havlíčkův Brod)
Slavětín (market town; Louny)
Slavětín (Olomouc)
Slavětín nad Metují (Náchod)
Slavhostice (Jičín)
Slavičín (town; Zlín)
Slavičky (Třebíč)
Slavíkov (Havlíčkův Brod)
Slavíkovice (Třebíč)
Slavkov (Opava)
Slavkov (Uherské Hradiště)
Slavkov pod Hostýnem (Kroměříž)
Slavkov u Brna (town; Vyškov)
Slavníč (Havlíčkův Brod)
Slavonice (town; Jindřichův Hradec)
Slavoňov (Náchod)
Slavošov (Kutná Hora)
Šléglov (Šumperk)
Slepotice (Pardubice)
Slezské Pavlovice (Bruntál)
Slezské Rudoltice (Bruntál)
Slopné (Zlín)
Sloup v Čechách (Česká Lípa)
Sloup (market town; Blansko)
Sloupnice (Ústí nad Orlicí)
Sloupno (Havlíčkův Brod)
Sloupno (Hradec Králové)
Sloveč (Nymburk)
Slověnice (Benešov)
Sluhy (Prague-East)
Šluknov (town; Děčín)
Slunečná (Česká Lípa)
Slup (Znojmo)
Slušovice (town; Zlín)
Sluštice (Prague-East)
Služátky (Havlíčkův Brod)
Služovice (Opava)
Smečno (town; Kladno)
Smědčice (Rokycany)
Smetanova Lhota (Písek)
Smidary (Hradec Králové)
Smilkov (Benešov)
Smilovice (Frýdek-Místek)
Smilovice (Mladá Boleslav)
Smilovice (Rakovník)
Smilovy Hory (Tábor)
Smiřice (town; Hradec Králové)
Smolné Pece (Karlovy Vary)
Smolnice (Louny)
Smolotely (Příbram)
Smrček (Chrudim)
Smrčná (Jihlava)
Smrk (Třebíč)
Smržice (Prostějov)
Smržov (Hradec Králové)
Smržov (Jindřichův Hradec)
Smržovka (town; Jablonec nad Nisou)
Snědovice (Litoměřice)
Snět (Benešov)
Sněžné (Rychnov nad Kněžnou)
Sněžné (market town; Žďár nad Sázavou)
Snovídky (Vyškov)
Sobčice (Jičín)
Soběchleby (Přerov)
Soběhrdy (Benešov)
Soběkury (Plzeň-South)
Soběnov (Český Krumlov)
Soběraz (Jičín)
Soběslav (town; Tábor)
Soběslavice (Liberec)
Soběsuky (Kroměříž)
Soběšice (Klatovy)
Soběšín (Kutná Hora)
Soběšovice (Frýdek-Místek)
Sobětuchy (Chrudim)
Sobíňov (Havlíčkův Brod)
Sobíšky (Přerov)
Sobkovice (Ústí nad Orlicí)
Sobotín (Šumperk)
Sobotka (town; Jičín)
Sobotovice (Brno-Country)
Sobůlky (Hodonín)
Sojovice (Mladá Boleslav)
Sokoleč (Nymburk)
Sokolnice (Brno-Country)
Sokolov (town; Sokolov)
Solenice (Příbram)
Solnice (town; Rychnov nad Kněžnou)
Šonov (Náchod)
Sopotnice (Ústí nad Orlicí)
Sopřeč (Pardubice)
Sosnová (Česká Lípa)
Sosnová (Opava)
Šošůvka (Blansko)
Souňov (Kutná Hora)
Sousedovice (Strakonice)
Soutice (Benešov)
Sovětice (Hradec Králové)
Sovínky (market town; Mladá Boleslav)
Sovolusky (Pardubice)
Spálené Poříčí (town; Plzeň-South)
Spálov (market town; Nový Jičín)
Spáňov (Domažlice)
Spělkov (Žďár nad Sázavou)
Spešov (Blansko)
Špičky (Přerov)
Špindlerův Mlýn (town; Trutnov)
Spojil (Pardubice)
Spomyšl (Mělník)
Spořice (Chomutov)
Spytihněv (Zlín)
Srbce (Prostějov)
Srbeč (Rakovník)
Srbice (Domažlice)
Srbice (Teplice)
Srbská Kamenice (Děčín)
Srbsko (Beroun)
Srby (Domažlice)
Srby (Plzeň-South)
Srch (Pardubice)
Srní (Klatovy)
Srnín (Český Krumlov)
Srnojedy (Pardubice)
Srubec (České Budějovice)
Sruby (Ústí nad Orlicí)
Štáblovice (Opava)
Stachy (Prachatice)
Stádlec (market town; Tábor)
Šťáhlavy (Plzeň-City)
Stáj (Jihlava)
Stálky (Znojmo)
Staňkov (town; Domažlice)
Staňkov (Jindřichův Hradec)
Staňkovice (Kutná Hora)
Staňkovice (Litoměřice)
Staňkovice (Louny)
Stanovice (Karlovy Vary)
Stanovice (Trutnov)
Stanoviště (Brno-Country)
Stará Červená Voda (Jeseník)
Stará Huť (Příbram)
Stará Lysá (Nymburk)
Stará Paka (Jičín)
Stará Říše (market town; Jihlava)
Stará Ves (Bruntál)
Stará Ves (Přerov)
Stará Ves nad Ondřejnicí (Ostrava-City)
Stará Voda (Cheb)
Stará Voda (Hradec Králové)
Staré Bříště (Pelhřimov)
Staré Buky (Trutnov)
Staré Hamry (Frýdek-Místek)
Staré Heřminovy (Bruntál)
Staré Hobzí (Jindřichův Hradec)
Staré Hodějovice (České Budějovice)
Staré Hradiště (Pardubice)
Staré Hrady (Jičín)
Staré Hutě (Uherské Hradiště)
Staré Jesenčany (Pardubice)
Staré Křečany (Děčín)
Staré Město (Bruntál)
Staré Město (Frýdek-Místek)
Staré Město (Svitavy)
Staré Město (town; Šumperk)
Staré Město (town; Uherské Hradiště)
Staré Město pod Landštejnem (market town; Jindřichův Hradec)
Staré Místo (Jičín)
Staré Sedliště (Tachov)
Staré Sedlo (Sokolov)
Staré Sedlo (Tachov)
Staré Smrkovice (Jičín)
Staré Těchanovice (Opava)
Staré Ždánice (Pardubice)
Stařeč (market town; Třebíč)
Stařechovice (Prostějov)
Staříč (Frýdek-Místek)
Starkoč (Kutná Hora)
Stárkov (town; Náchod)
Štarnov (Olomouc)
Starosedlský Hrádek (Příbram)
Starovice (Břeclav)
Starovičky (Břeclav)
Starý Bydžov (Hradec Králové)
Starý Hrozenkov (Uherské Hradiště)
Starý Jičín (Nový Jičín)
Starý Kolín (Kolín)
Starý Mateřov (Pardubice)
Starý Petřín (Znojmo)
Starý Plzenec (town; Plzeň-City)
Starý Poddvorov (Hodonín)
Starý Šachov (Děčín)
Starý Vestec (Nymburk)
Stašov (Beroun)
Stašov (Svitavy)
Statenice (Prague-West)
Stavenice (Šumperk)
Stavěšice (Hodonín)
Stéblová (Pardubice)
Stebno (Ústí nad Labem)
Stěbořice (Opava)
Štěchov (Blansko)
Štěchovice (market town; Prague-West)
Štěchovice (Strakonice)
Štědrá (Karlovy Vary)
Stehelčeves (Kladno)
Stehlovice (Písek)
Štěkeň (market town; Strakonice)
Štěměchy (Třebíč)
Štěnovice (Plzeň-South)
Štěnovický Borek (Plzeň-City)
Štěpánkovice (Opava)
Štěpánov (town; Olomouc)
Štěpánov nad Svratkou (market town; Žďár nad Sázavou)
Štěpánovice (Brno-Country)
Štěpánovice (České Budějovice)
Štěpkov (Třebíč)
Šternberk (town; Olomouc)
Štětí (town; Litoměřice)
Štětkovice (Příbram)
Stěžery (Hradec Králové)
Štichov (Plzeň-North)
Štichovice (Plzeň-North)
Štíhlice (Kolín)
Stínava (Prostějov)
Štipoklasy (Kutná Hora)
Štítary (market town; Znojmo)
Štítina (Opava)
Štítná nad Vláří-Popov (Zlín)
Štítov (Rokycany)
Štíty (town; Šumperk)
Stochov (town; Kladno)
Stod (town; Plzeň-South)
Stojčín (Pelhřimov)
Stojice (Pardubice)
Štoky (market town; Havlíčkův Brod)
Stolany (Chrudim)
Stonařov (market town; Jihlava)
Stonava (Karviná)
Stošíkovice na Louce (Znojmo)
Stožec (Prachatice)
Stožice (Strakonice)
Stračov (Hradec Králové)
Stradonice (Kladno)
Stradouň (Ústí nad Orlicí)
Strahovice (Opava)
Strachoňovice (Jihlava)
Strachotice (Znojmo)
Strachotín (Břeclav)
Strachujov (Žďár nad Sázavou)
Strakonice (town; Strakonice)
Strakov (Svitavy)
Straky (Nymburk)
Štramberk (town; Nový Jičín)
Strančice (Prague-East)
Stránecká Zhoř (Žďár nad Sázavou)
Strání (Uherské Hradiště)
Stránka (Mělník)
Stranný (Benešov)
Strašice (Rokycany)
Strašice (Strakonice)
Strašín (Klatovy)
Straškov-Vodochody (Litoměřice)
Strašnov (Mladá Boleslav)
Strašov (Pardubice)
Stratov (Nymburk)
Stráž (Domažlice)
Stráž (market town; Tachov)
Stráž nad Nežárkou (town; Jindřichův Hradec)
Stráž nad Nisou (Liberec)
Stráž nad Ohří (Karlovy Vary)
Stráž pod Ralskem (town; Česká Lípa)
Strážek (market town; Žďár nad Sázavou)
Stražisko (Prostějov)
Strážiště (Mladá Boleslav)
Strážkovice (České Budějovice)
Strážná (Ústí nad Orlicí)
Strážné (Trutnov)
Strážnice (town; Hodonín)
Strážný (market town; Prachatice)
Strážov (town; Klatovy)
Strážovice (Hodonín)
Středokluky (Prague-West)
Střelice (Brno-Country)
Střelice (Plzeň-South)
Střelice (Znojmo)
Střelná (Vsetín)
Střelské Hoštice (Strakonice)
Střemošice (Chrudim)
Střemy (Mělník)
Střeň (Olomouc)
Strenice (Mladá Boleslav)
Střevač (Jičín)
Střezetice (Hradec Králové)
Střezimíř (Benešov)
Strhaře (Brno-Country)
Stříbrná Skalice (Kolín)
Stříbrná (Sokolov)
Stříbrné Hory (Havlíčkův Brod)
Stříbrnice (Přerov)
Stříbrnice (Uherské Hradiště)
Stříbro (town; Tachov)
Stříbřec (Jindřichův Hradec)
Střílky (Kroměříž)
Střítež (Český Krumlov)
Střítež (Frýdek-Místek)
Střítež (Jihlava)
Střítež (Pelhřimov)
Střítež (Třebíč)
Střítež (Žďár nad Sázavou)
Střítež nad Bečvou (Vsetín)
Střítež nad Ludinou (Přerov)
Střítež pod Křemešníkem (Pelhřimov)
Střížov (České Budějovice)
Střížovice (Jindřichův Hradec)
Střížovice (Kroměříž)
Střížovice (Plzeň-South)
Strmilov (town; Jindřichův Hradec)
Strojetice (Benešov)
Stropešín (Třebíč)
Struhařov (Benešov)
Struhařov (Prague-East)
Strukov (Olomouc)
Strunkovice nad Blanicí (market town; Prachatice)
Strunkovice nad Volyňkou (Strakonice)
Strupčice (Chomutov)
Stružinec (Semily)
Stružná (Karlovy Vary)
Stružnice (Česká Lípa)
Strýčice (České Budějovice)
Studánka (Tachov)
Studená (Jindřichův Hradec)
Studená (Plzeň-North)
Studené (Ústí nad Orlicí)
Studenec (Semily)
Studenec (Třebíč)
Studeněves (Kladno)
Studénka (town; Nový Jičín)
Studený (Benešov)
Študlov (Svitavy)
Študlov (Zlín)
Studnice (Chrudim)
Studnice (Náchod)
Studnice (Třebíč)
Studnice (Vyškov)
Stupava (Uherské Hradiště)
Stvolínky (Česká Lípa)
Stvolová (Blansko)
Šubířov (Prostějov)
Suchá (Jihlava)
Suchá Lhota (Svitavy)
Suchá Loz (Uherské Hradiště)
Suchdol (market town; Kutná Hora)
Suchdol (Prostějov)
Suchdol nad Lužnicí (town; Jindřichův Hradec)
Suchdol nad Odrou (market town; Nový Jičín)
Suchodol (Příbram)
Suchohrdly u Miroslavi (Znojmo)
Suchohrdly (Znojmo)
Suchomasty (Beroun)
Suchonice (Olomouc)
Suchov (Hodonín)
Suchovršice (Trutnov)
Suchý Důl (Náchod)
Suchý (Blansko)
Sudějov (Kutná Hora)
Sudice (Blansko)
Sudice (Opava)
Sudice (Třebíč)
Sudislav nad Orlicí (Ústí nad Orlicí)
Sudkov (Šumperk)
Sudoměř (Mladá Boleslav)
Sudoměřice u Bechyně (Tábor)
Sudoměřice u Tábora (Tábor)
Sudoměřice (Hodonín)
Sudovo Hlavno (Mladá Boleslav)
Sudslava (Ústí nad Orlicí)
Sukorady (Jičín)
Sukorady (Mladá Boleslav)
Sulejovice (Litoměřice)
Sulice (Prague-East)
Sulíkov (Blansko)
Sulimov (Kroměříž)
Sulislav (Tachov)
Sulkovec (Žďár nad Sázavou)
Šumavské Hoštice (Prachatice)
Šumice (Brno-Country)
Šumice (Uherské Hradiště)
Šumná (Znojmo)
Šumperk (town; Šumperk)
Šumvald (Olomouc)
Supíkovice (Jeseník)
Sušice (town; Klatovy)
Sušice (Přerov)
Sušice (Uherské Hradiště)
Švábenice (market town; Vyškov)
Švábov (Jihlava)
Svárov (Kladno)
Svárov (Uherské Hradiště)
Svatá Maří (Prachatice)
Svatá (Beroun)
Svatava (market town; Sokolov)
Svaté Pole (Příbram)
Svatobořice-Mistřín (Hodonín)
Svatojanský Újezd (Jičín)
Svatoňovice (Opava)
Svatoslav (Brno-Country)
Svatoslav (Třebíč)
Svatý Jan nad Malší (České Budějovice)
Svatý Jan pod Skalou (Beroun)
Svatý Jan (Příbram)
Svatý Jiří (Ústí nad Orlicí)
Svatý Mikuláš (Kutná Hora)
Svébohov (Šumperk)
Svémyslice (Prague-East)
Svépravice (Pelhřimov)
Svéradice (Klatovy)
Svésedlice (Olomouc)
Světce (Jindřichův Hradec)
Světec (Teplice)
Světí (Hradec Králové)
Světice (Prague-East)
Světlá (Blansko)
Světlá Hora (Bruntál)
Světlá nad Sázavou (town; Havlíčkův Brod)
Světlá pod Ještědem (Liberec)
Světlík (Český Krumlov)
Světnov (Žďár nad Sázavou)
Sviadnov (Frýdek-Místek)
Svídnice (Chrudim)
Svídnice (Rychnov nad Kněžnou)
Švihov (town; Klatovy)
Švihov (Rakovník)
Svijanský Újezd (Liberec)
Svijany (Liberec)
Svinaře (Beroun)
Svinařov (Kladno)
Svinčany (Pardubice)
Svinošice (Blansko)
Sviny (Tábor)
Sviny (Žďár nad Sázavou)
Svitávka (market town; Blansko)
Svitavy (town; Svitavy)
Svoboda nad Úpou (town; Trutnov)
Svobodné Heřmanice (Bruntál)
Svojanov (market town; Svitavy)
Svojek (Semily)
Svojetice (Prague-East)
Svojetín (Rakovník)
Svojkov (Česká Lípa)
Svojkovice (Jihlava)
Svojkovice (Rokycany)
Svojšice (Kolín)
Svojšice (Pardubice)
Svojšice (Příbram)
Svojšín (Tachov)
Svor (Česká Lípa)
Svrabov (Tábor)
Svratka (town; Žďár nad Sázavou)
Svratouch (Chrudim)
Svrkyně (Prague-West)
Sychrov (Liberec)
Sýkořice (Rakovník)
Synalov (Brno-Country)
Synkov-Slemeno (Rychnov nad Kněžnou)
Syrov (Pelhřimov)
Syrovátka (Hradec Králové)
Syrovice (Brno-Country)
Syrovín (Hodonín)
Syřenov (Semily)
Sytno (Tachov)

T

Tábor (town; Tábor)
Tachlovice (Prague-West)
Tachov (Česká Lípa)
Tachov (town; Tachov)
Tálín (Písek)
Tanvald (town; Jablonec nad Nisou)
Tasov (Hodonín)
Tašov (Ústí nad Labem)
Tasov (Žďár nad Sázavou)
Tasovice (Blansko)
Tasovice (Znojmo)
Tatce (Nymburk)
Tatenice (Ústí nad Orlicí)
Tatiná (Plzeň-North)
Tatobity (Semily)
Tatrovice (Sokolov)
Tavíkovice (Znojmo)
Tečovice (Zlín)
Tehov (Benešov)
Tehov (Prague-East)
Tehovec (Prague-East)
Těchařovice (Příbram)
Těchlovice (Děčín)
Těchlovice (Hradec Králové)
Těchobuz (Pelhřimov)
Těchonín (Ústí nad Orlicí)
Telč (town; Jihlava)
Telecí (Svitavy)
Telnice (Brno-Country)
Telnice (Ústí nad Labem)
Temelín (České Budějovice)
Temešvár (Písek)
Těmice (Hodonín)
Těmice (Pelhřimov)
Těně (Rokycany)
Teplá (town; Karlovy Vary)
Teplice nad Bečvou (Přerov)
Teplice nad Metují (town; Náchod)
Teplice (city; Teplice)
Teplička (Karlovy Vary)
Teplýšovice (Benešov)
Terešov (Rokycany)
Terezín (Hodonín)
Terezín (town; Litoměřice)
Těrlicko (Karviná)
Těšany (Brno-Country)
Těšetice (Olomouc)
Těšetice (Znojmo)
Těškov (Rokycany)
Těškovice (Opava)
Těšovice (Prachatice)
Těšovice (Sokolov)
Tetčice (Brno-Country)
Tetín (Beroun)
Tetín (Jičín)
Tetov (Pardubice)
Tchořovice (Strakonice)
Tichá (Nový Jičín)
Tichonice (Benešov)
Tichov (Zlín)
Tis u Blatna (Plzeň-North)
Tis (Havlíčkův Brod)
Tisá (Ústí nad Labem)
Tísek (Nový Jičín)
Tisem (Benešov)
Tismice (Kolín)
Tisová (Tachov)
Tisová (Ústí nad Orlicí)
Tisovec (Chrudim)
Tišice (Mělník)
Tišnov (town; Brno-Country)
Tišnovská Nová Ves (Brno-Country)
Tištín (market town; Prostějov)
Tlučná (Plzeň-North)
Tlumačov (Domažlice)
Tlumačov (Zlín)
Tlustice (Beroun)
Tmaň (Beroun)
Točník (Beroun)
Tochovice (Příbram)
Tojice (Plzeň-South)
Tomice (Benešov)
Topolany (Vyškov)
Topolná (Uherské Hradiště)
Toušice (Kolín)
Toužetín (Louny)
Toužim (town; Karlovy Vary)
Tovačov (town; Přerov)
Tovéř (Olomouc)
Třanovice (Frýdek-Místek)
Traplice (Uherské Hradiště)
Travčice (Litoměřice)
Trboušany (Brno-Country)
Třebařov (Svitavy)
Třebčice (Plzeň-South)
Třebechovice pod Orebem (town; Hradec Králové)
Třebějice (Tábor)
Třebelovice (Třebíč)
Třebeň (Cheb)
Třebenice (town; Litoměřice)
Třebenice (Třebíč)
Třebestovice (Nymburk)
Třebešice (Benešov)
Třebešice (Kutná Hora)
Třebešov (Rychnov nad Kněžnou)
Třebětice (Jindřichův Hradec)
Třebětice (Kroměříž)
Třebětín (Kutná Hora)
Třebíč (town; Třebíč)
Třebihošť (Trutnov)
Třebichovice (Kladno)
Třebívlice (Litoměřice)
Třebíz (Kladno)
Třebnouševes (Jičín)
Třeboc (Rakovník)
Třebohostice (Strakonice)
Třebom (Opava)
Třeboň (town; Jindřichův Hradec)
Třebonín (Kutná Hora)
Třebosice (Pardubice)
Třebotov (Prague-West)
Třebovice (Ústí nad Orlicí)
Třebovle (Kolín)
Třebsko (Příbram)
Třebusice (Kladno)
Třebušín (Litoměřice)
Třemešná (Bruntál)
Třemešné (Tachov)
Třemošná (town; Plzeň-North)
Třemošnice (town; Chrudim)
Třesov (Třebíč)
Třesovice (Hradec Králové)
Třešovice (Strakonice)
Třešť (town; Jihlava)
Třeštice (Jihlava)
Třeština (Šumperk)
Trhanov (Domažlice)
Trhová Kamenice (market town; Chrudim)
Trhové Dušníky (Příbram)
Trhové Sviny (town; České Budějovice)
Trhový Štěpánov (town; Benešov)
Tři Dvory (Kolín)
Tři Sekery (Cheb)
Tři Studně (Žďár nad Sázavou)
Třibřichy (Chrudim)
Třinec (city; Frýdek-Místek)
Trmice (town; Ústí nad Labem)
Trnava (Třebíč)
Trnava (Zlín)
Trnávka (Nový Jičín)
Trnávka (Pardubice)
Trnov (Rychnov nad Kněžnou)
Trnová (Plzeň-North)
Trnová (Prague-West)
Trnovany (Litoměřice)
Trnové Pole (Znojmo)
Trojanovice (Nový Jičín)
Trojovice (Chrudim)
Trokavec (Rokycany)
Troskotovice (market town; Brno-Country)
Troskovice (Semily)
Trotina (Trutnov)
Troubelice (Olomouc)
Troubky-Zdislavice (Kroměříž)
Troubky (Přerov)
Troubsko (Brno-Country)
Trpík (Ústí nad Orlicí)
Trpín (Svitavy)
Trpísty (Tachov)
Trpišovice (Havlíčkův Brod)
Tršice (Olomouc)
Trstěnice (Cheb)
Trstěnice (Svitavy)
Trstěnice (Znojmo)
Třtěnice (Jičín)
Třtice (Rakovník)
Trubín (Beroun)
Trubská (Beroun)
Truskovice (Strakonice)
Trusnov (Pardubice)
Trutnov (town; Trutnov)
Tržek (Svitavy)
Tučapy (Tábor)
Tučapy (Uherské Hradiště)
Tučapy (Vyškov)
Tuchlovice (Kladno)
Tuchoměřice (Prague-West)
Tuchoraz (Kolín)
Tuchořice (Louny)
Tučín (Přerov)
Tuhaň (Česká Lípa)
Tuhaň (Mělník)
Tuklaty (Kolín)
Tulešice (Znojmo)
Tuněchody (Chrudim)
Tupadly (Kutná Hora)
Tupadly (Mělník)
Tupesy (Uherské Hradiště)
Tuř (Jičín)
Tuřany (Cheb)
Tuřany (Kladno)
Tuřice (Mladá Boleslav)
Turkovice (Pardubice)
Turnov (town; Semily)
Turovec (Tábor)
Turovice (Přerov)
Tursko (Prague-West)
Tušovice (Příbram)
Tutleky (Rychnov nad Kněžnou)
Tužice (Klatovy)
Tvarožná (Brno-Country)
Tvarožná Lhota (Hodonín)
Tvorovice (Prostějov)
Tvořihráz (Znojmo)
Tvrdkov (Bruntál)
Tvrdonice (Břeclav)
Tvrzice (Prachatice)
Týček (Rokycany)
Tymákov (Plzeň-City)
Týn nad Bečvou (Přerov)
Týn nad Vltavou (town; České Budějovice)
Týnec (Břeclav)
Týnec (Klatovy)
Týnec nad Labem (town; Kolín)
Týnec nad Sázavou (town; Benešov)
Týniště nad Orlicí (town; Rychnov nad Kněžnou)
Týniště (Plzeň-South)
Týnišťko (Pardubice)

U

Úbislavice (Jičín)
Ublo (Zlín)
Úboč (Domažlice)
Ubušínek (Žďár nad Sázavou)
Údlice (Chomutov)
Údrnice (Jičín)
Uhelná (Jeseník)
Uhelná Příbram (market town; Havlíčkův Brod)
Úherce (Louny)
Úherce (Plzeň-North)
Uherčice (Břeclav)
Úherčice (Chrudim)
Uherčice (Znojmo)
Uherské Hradiště (town; Uherské Hradiště)
Uhersko (Pardubice)
Uherský Brod (town; Uherské Hradiště)
Uherský Ostroh (town; Uherské Hradiště)
Úhlejov (Jičín)
Uhlířov (Opava)
Uhlířská Lhota (Kolín)
Uhlířské Janovice (town; Kutná Hora)
Úholičky (Prague-West)
Úhonice (Prague-West)
Úhořilka (Havlíčkův Brod)
Úhřetice (Chrudim)
Úhřetická Lhota (Pardubice)
Uhřice (Blansko)
Uhřice (Hodonín)
Uhřice (Kroměříž)
Uhřice (Vyškov)
Uhřičice (Přerov)
Uhřínov (Žďár nad Sázavou)
Uhy (Kladno)
Ujčov (Žďár nad Sázavou)
Újezd (Beroun)
Újezd (Domažlice)
Újezd (Olomouc)
Újezd (Žďár nad Sázavou)
Újezd (Zlín)
Újezd (Znojmo)
Újezd nade Mží (Plzeň-North)
Újezd pod Troskami (Jičín)
Újezd u Boskovic (Blansko)
Újezd u Brna (town; Brno-Country)
Újezd u Černé Hory (Blansko)
Újezd u Chocně (Ústí nad Orlicí)
Újezd u Plánice (Klatovy)
Újezd u Přelouče (Pardubice)
Újezd u Rosic (Brno-Country)
Újezd u Sezemic (Pardubice)
Újezd u Svatého Kříže (Rokycany)
Újezd u Tišnova (Brno-Country)
Újezdec (Jindřichův Hradec)
Újezdec (Mělník)
Újezdec (Prachatice)
Újezdec (Svitavy)
Újezdec (Uherské Hradiště)
Újezdeček (Teplice)
Ujkovice (Mladá Boleslav)
Úlehle (Strakonice)
Úlibice (Jičín)
Úlice (Plzeň-North)
Úmonín (Kutná Hora)
Úmyslovice (Nymburk)
Únanov (Znojmo)
Unčín (Žďár nad Sázavou)
Únehle (Tachov)
Únějovice (Domažlice)
Úněšov (Plzeň-North)
Únětice (Plzeň-South)
Únětice (Prague-West)
Unhošť (town; Kladno)
Únice (Strakonice)
Uničov (town; Olomouc)
Unín (Brno-Country)
Unkovice (Brno-Country)
Úpice (town; Trutnov)
Úpohlavy (Litoměřice)
Urbanice (Hradec Králové)
Urbanice (Pardubice)
Urbanov (Jihlava)
Určice (Prostějov)
Úsilné (České Budějovice)
Úsilov (Domažlice)
Úsobí (market town; Havlíčkův Brod)
Úsobrno (Blansko)
Úsov (town; Šumperk)
Úštěk (town; Litoměřice)
Ústí (Jihlava)
Ústí (Přerov)
Ústí (Vsetín)
Ústí nad Labem (city; Ústí nad Labem)
Ústí nad Orlicí (town; Ústí nad Orlicí)
Ústín (Olomouc)
Ústrašice (Tábor)
Ústrašín (Pelhřimov)
Ústup (Blansko)
Úsuší (Brno-Country)
Útěchov (Svitavy)
Útěchovice pod Stražištěm (Pelhřimov)
Útěchovice (Pelhřimov)
Útěchovičky (Pelhřimov)
Úterý (town; Plzeň-North)
Útušice (Plzeň-South)
Útvina (Karlovy Vary)
Úvalno (Bruntál)
Úvaly (town; Prague-East)
Uzenice (Strakonice)
Uzeničky (Strakonice)
Úžice (Kutná Hora)
Úžice (Mělník)

V

Vacenovice (Hodonín)
Václavice (Benešov)
Václavov u Bruntálu (Bruntál)
Václavovice (Ostrava-City)
Václavy (Rakovník)
Vacov (Prachatice)
Vacovice (Strakonice)
Val (Rychnov nad Kněžnou)
Val (Tábor)
Valašská Bystřice (Vsetín)
Valašská Polanka (Vsetín)
Valašská Senice (Vsetín)
Valašské Klobouky (town; Zlín)
Valašské Meziříčí (town; Vsetín)
Valašské Příkazy (Zlín)
Valdice (Jičín)
Valdíkov (Třebíč)
Valeč (Karlovy Vary)
Valeč (Třebíč)
Valchov (Blansko)
Valkeřice (Děčín)
Valšov (Bruntál)
Valtice (town; Břeclav)
Valtrovice (Znojmo)
Valy (Cheb)
Valy (Pardubice)
Vamberk (town; Rychnov nad Kněžnou)
Vanov (Jihlava)
Vanovice (Blansko)
Vanůvek (Jihlava)
Vápenice (Uherské Hradiště)
Vápenná (Jeseník)
Vápenný Podol (Chrudim)
Vápno (Pardubice)
Vápovice (Jihlava)
Varnsdorf (town; Děčín)
Varvažov (Písek)
Vatín (Žďár nad Sázavou)
Vavřinec (Blansko)
Vavřinec (Kutná Hora)
Vážany (Blansko)
Vážany (Uherské Hradiště)
Vážany (Vyškov)
Vážany nad Litavou (Vyškov)
Včelákov (market town; Chrudim)
Včelná (České Budějovice)
Včelnička (Pelhřimov)
Věcov (Žďár nad Sázavou)
Vědomice (Litoměřice)
Vedrovice (Znojmo)
Věchnov (Žďár nad Sázavou)
Vejprnice (Plzeň-North)
Vejprty (town; Chomutov)
Vejvanov (Rokycany)
Vejvanovice (Chrudim)
Velatice (Brno-Country)
Velečín (Plzeň-North)
Velehrad (Uherské Hradiště)
Velemín (Litoměřice)
Velemyšleves (Louny)
Veleň (Prague-East)
Velenice (Česká Lípa)
Velenice (Nymburk)
Velenka (Nymburk)
Velenov (Blansko)
Velešín (town; Český Krumlov)
Velešovice (Vyškov)
Veletiny (Uherské Hradiště)
Veletov (Kolín)
Velhartice (Klatovy)
Velichov (Karlovy Vary)
Velichovky (Náchod)
Veliká Ves (Chomutov)
Veliká Ves (Prague-East)
Velim (Kolín)
Veliny (Pardubice)
Veliš (Benešov)
Veliš (Jičín)
Velká Bíteš (town; Žďár nad Sázavou)
Velká Buková (Rakovník)
Velká Bukovina (Děčín)
Velká Bystřice (town; Olomouc)
Velká Dobrá (Kladno)
Velká Hleďsebe (Cheb)
Velká Chmelištná (Rakovník)
Velká Chyška (Pelhřimov)
Velká Jesenice (Náchod)
Velká Kraš (Jeseník)
Velká Lečice (Příbram)
Velká Lhota (Vsetín)
Velká Losenice (Žďár nad Sázavou)
Velká nad Veličkou (Hodonín)
Velká Polom (Ostrava-City)
Velká Skrovnice (Ústí nad Orlicí)
Velká Štáhle (Bruntál)
Velká Turná (Strakonice)
Velké Albrechtice (Nový Jičín)
Velké Bílovice (town; Břeclav)
Velké Březno (Ústí nad Labem)
Velké Hamry (town; Jablonec nad Nisou)
Velké Heraltice (Opava)
Velké Hostěrádky (Břeclav)
Velké Hoštice (Opava)
Velké Hydčice (Klatovy)
Velké Chvojno (Ústí nad Labem)
Velké Janovice (Žďár nad Sázavou)
Velké Karlovice (Vsetín)
Velké Kunětice (Jeseník)
Velké Losiny (Šumperk)
Velké Meziříčí (town; Žďár nad Sázavou)
Velké Němčice (market town; Břeclav)
Velké Opatovice (town; Blansko)
Velké Pavlovice (town; Břeclav)
Velké Petrovice (Náchod)
Velké Popovice (Prague-East)
Velké Poříčí (market town; Náchod)
Velké Přílepy (Prague-West)
Velké Přítočno (Kladno)
Velké Svatoňovice (Trutnov)
Velké Tresné (Žďár nad Sázavou)
Velké Všelisy (Mladá Boleslav)
Velké Žernoseky (Litoměřice)
Velký Beranov (Jihlava)
Velký Bor (Klatovy)
Velký Borek (Mělník)
Velký Chlumec (Beroun)
Velký Karlov (Znojmo)
Velký Luh (Cheb)
Velký Malahov (Domažlice)
Velký Ořechov (Zlín)
Velký Osek (Kolín)
Velký Ratmírov (Jindřichův Hradec)
Velký Rybník (Pelhřimov)
Velký Šenov (town; Děčín)
Velký Třebešov (Náchod)
Velký Týnec (Olomouc)
Velký Újezd (market town; Olomouc)
Velký Valtinov (Česká Lípa)
Velký Vřešťov (market town; Trutnov)
Vělopolí (Frýdek-Místek)
Veltěže (Louny)
Veltruby (Kolín)
Veltrusy (town; Mělník)
Velvary (town; Kladno)
Vémyslice (market town; Znojmo)
Vendolí (Svitavy)
Vendryně (Frýdek-Místek)
Vepříkov (Havlíčkův Brod)
Vepřová (Žďár nad Sázavou)
Verměřovice (Ústí nad Orlicí)
Verneřice (town; Děčín)
Vernéřovice (Náchod)
Vernířovice (Šumperk)
Věrovany (Olomouc)
Verušičky (Karlovy Vary)
Veřovice (Nový Jičín)
Ves Touškov (Plzeň-South)
Vesce (Tábor)
Veselá (Pelhřimov)
Veselá (Rokycany)
Veselá (Semily)
Veselá (Zlín)
Veselé (Děčín)
Veselí nad Lužnicí (town; Tábor)
Veselí nad Moravou (town; Hodonín)
Veselí (Pardubice)
Veselice (Mladá Boleslav)
Veselíčko (Písek)
Veselíčko (Přerov)
Veselý Žďár (Havlíčkův Brod)
Vestec (Náchod)
Vestec (Nymburk)
Vestec (Prague-West)
Věstín (Žďár nad Sázavou)
Věšín (Příbram)
Věteřov (Hodonín)
Větrný Jeníkov (market town; Jihlava)
Větrušice (Prague-East)
Větřkovice (Opava)
Větřní (town; Český Krumlov)
Vevčice (Znojmo)
Veverská Bítýška (town; Brno-Country)
Veverské Knínice (Brno-Country)
Věž (Havlíčkův Brod)
Věžky (Kroměříž)
Věžky (Přerov)
Věžná (Pelhřimov)
Věžná (Žďár nad Sázavou)
Věžnice (Havlíčkův Brod)
Věžnice (Jihlava)
Věžnička (Jihlava)
Věžovatá Pláně (Český Krumlov)
Vchynice (Litoměřice)
Víceměřice (Prostějov)
Vícemil (Jindřichův Hradec)
Vícenice u Náměště nad Oslavou (Třebíč)
Vícenice (Třebíč)
Víchová nad Jizerou (Semily)
Vícov (Prostějov)
Vidče (Vsetín)
Vídeň (Žďár nad Sázavou)
Vidice (Domažlice)
Vidice (Kutná Hora)
Vidim (Mělník)
Vidlatá Seč (Svitavy)
Vidnava (town; Jeseník)
Vidochov (Jičín)
Vidonín (Žďár nad Sázavou)
Vidov (České Budějovice)
Vigantice (Vsetín)
Vikantice (Šumperk)
Vikýřovice (Šumperk)
Vílanec (Jihlava)
Vilantice (Trutnov)
Vilémov (Děčín)
Vilémov (market town; Havlíčkův Brod)
Vilémov (Chomutov)
Vilémov (Olomouc)
Vilémovice (Blansko)
Vilémovice (Havlíčkův Brod)
Vilice (Tábor)
Vimperk (town; Prachatice)
Vinary (Hradec Králové)
Vinary (Chrudim)
Vinaře (Kutná Hora)
Vinařice (Beroun)
Vinařice (Kladno)
Vinařice (Louny)
Vinařice (Mladá Boleslav)
Vincencov (Prostějov)
Vinec (Mladá Boleslav)
Viničné Šumice (Brno-Country)
Vintířov (Sokolov)
Vír (Žďár nad Sázavou)
Víska u Jevíčka (Svitavy)
Víska (Havlíčkův Brod)
Vísky (Blansko)
Vísky (Rokycany)
Višňová (Jindřichův Hradec)
Višňová (Liberec)
Višňová (Příbram)
Višňové (market town; Znojmo)
Vítanov (Chrudim)
Vitčice (Prostějov)
Vítějeves (Svitavy)
Vitějovice (Prachatice)
Vítězná (Trutnov)
Vitice (Kolín)
Vitín (České Budějovice)
Vitiněves (Jičín)
Vítkov (town; Opava)
Vítkovice (Semily)
Vítonice (Kroměříž)
Vítonice (Znojmo)
Vizovice (town; Zlín)
Vižina (Beroun)
Vlachova Lhota (Zlín)
Vlachovice (Zlín)
Vlachovice (Žďár nad Sázavou)
Vlachovo Březí (town; Prachatice)
Vlačice (Kutná Hora)
Vladislav (market town; Třebíč)
Vlasatice (Brno-Country)
Vlastec (Písek)
Vlastějovice (Kutná Hora)
Vlastiboř (Jablonec nad Nisou)
Vlastiboř (Tábor)
Vlastibořice (Liberec)
Vlastislav (Litoměřice)
Vlašim (town; Benešov)
Vlčatín (Třebíč)
Vlčetínec (Jindřichův Hradec)
Vlčeves (Tábor)
Vlčí Habřina (Pardubice)
Vlčí (Plzeň-South)
Vlčice (Jeseník)
Vlčice (Trutnov)
Vlčkov (Ústí nad Orlicí)
Vlčková (Zlín)
Vlčkovice v Podkrkonoší (Trutnov)
Vlčnov (Uherské Hradiště)
Vlčtejn (Plzeň-South)
Vlkančice (Kolín)
Vlkaneč (Kutná Hora)
Vlkanov (Domažlice)
Vlkanov (Havlíčkův Brod)
Vlkava (Mladá Boleslav)
Vlkoš (Hodonín)
Vlkoš (Přerov)
Vlkov (České Budějovice)
Vlkov (Náchod)
Vlkov (Tábor)
Vlkov (Žďár nad Sázavou)
Vlkov pod Oškobrhem (Nymburk)
Vlkovice (Cheb)
Vlksice (Písek)
Vnorovy (Hodonín)
Vochov (Plzeň-North)
Voděrady (Blansko)
Voděrady (Rychnov nad Kněžnou)
Voděrady (Ústí nad Orlicí)
Vodice (Tábor)
Vodňany (town; Strakonice)
Vodochody (Prague-East)
Vodranty (Kutná Hora)
Vodslivy (Benešov)
Vohančice (Brno-Country)
Vojkov (Benešov)
Vojkovice (Brno-Country)
Vojkovice (Frýdek-Místek)
Vojkovice (Karlovy Vary)
Vojkovice (Mělník)
Vojníkov (Písek)
Vojnův Městec (market town; Žďár nad Sázavou)
Vojslavice (Pelhřimov)
Vojtanov (Cheb)
Vojtěchov (Chrudim)
Vokov (Pelhřimov)
Volanice (Jičín)
Volárna (Kolín)
Volary (town; Prachatice)
Volduchy (Rokycany)
Voleč (Pardubice)
Volenice (Příbram)
Volenice (Strakonice)
Volevčice (Jihlava)
Volevčice (Most)
Volfartice (Česká Lípa)
Volfířov (Jindřichův Hradec)
Volyně (town; Strakonice)
Vonoklasy (Prague-West)
Vortová (Chrudim)
Votice (town; Benešov)
Voznice (Příbram)
Vrábče (České Budějovice)
Vraclav (Ústí nad Orlicí)
Vracov (town; Hodonín)
Vracovice (Benešov)
Vracovice (Znojmo)
Vračovice-Orlov (Ústí nad Orlicí)
Vraňany (Mělník)
Vrančice (Příbram)
Vrané nad Vltavou (Prague-West)
Vranov (Benešov)
Vranov (Brno-Country)
Vranov (Tachov)
Vranov nad Dyjí (market town; Znojmo)
Vranová Lhota (Svitavy)
Vranová (Blansko)
Vranovice (Brno-Country)
Vranovice (Příbram)
Vranovice-Kelčice (Prostějov)
Vranovská Ves (Znojmo)
Vraný (market town; Kladno)
Vratěnín (market town; Znojmo)
Vratimov (town; Ostrava-City)
Vratislávka (Brno-Country)
Vrátkov (Kolín)
Vrátno (Mladá Boleslav)
Vráto (České Budějovice)
Vráž (Beroun)
Vráž (Písek)
Vražkov (Litoměřice)
Vražné (Nový Jičín)
Vrážné (Svitavy)
Vrbátky (Prostějov)
Vrbatův Kostelec (Chrudim)
Vrbčany (Kolín)
Vrbice (Břeclav)
Vrbice (Jičín)
Vrbice (Karlovy Vary)
Vrbice (Litoměřice)
Vrbice (Nymburk)
Vrbice (Prachatice)
Vrbice (Rychnov nad Kněžnou)
Vrbičany (Kladno)
Vrbičany (Litoměřice)
Vrbka (Kroměříž)
Vrbno nad Lesy (Louny)
Vrbno pod Pradědem (town; Bruntál)
Vrbová Lhota (Kolín)
Vrbovec (Znojmo)
Vrchlabí (town; Trutnov)
Vrchoslavice (Prostějov)
Vrchotovy Janovice (market town; Benešov)
Vrchovany (Česká Lípa)
Vrchovnice (Hradec Králové)
Vrchy (Nový Jičín)
Vrcovice (Písek)
Vrčeň (Plzeň-South)
Vrdy (Kutná Hora)
Vrhaveč (Klatovy)
Vřesina (Opava)
Vřesina (Ostrava-City)
Vřeskovice (Klatovy)
Vřesník (Jičín)
Vřesová (Sokolov)
Vřesovice (Hodonín)
Vřesovice (Prostějov)
Vroutek (town; Louny)
Vrskmaň (Chomutov)
Vršce (Jičín)
Vršovice (Louny)
Vršovice (Opava)
Vršovka (Náchod)
Vrutice (Litoměřice)
Vsetín (town; Vsetín)
Vstiš (Plzeň-South)
Všechlapy (Benešov)
Všechlapy (Nymburk)
Všechovice (Brno-Country)
Všechovice (Přerov)
Všehrdy (Chomutov)
Všehrdy (Plzeň-North)
Všejany (Mladá Boleslav)
Všekary (Plzeň-North)
Všelibice (Liberec)
Všemina (Zlín)
Všemyslice (České Budějovice)
Všeň (Semily)
Všenice (Rokycany)
Všenory (Prague-West)
Všepadly (Domažlice)
Všeradice (Beroun)
Všeradov (Chrudim)
Všeruby (market town; Domažlice)
Všeruby (town; Plzeň-North)
Všestary (Hradec Králové)
Všestary (Prague-East)
Všestudy (Chomutov)
Všestudy (Mělník)
Všesulov (Rakovník)
Všetaty (market town; Mělník)
Všetaty (Rakovník)
Vševily (Příbram)
Výčapy (Třebíč)
Vydří (Jindřichův Hradec)
Vykáň (Nymburk)
Vyklantice (Pelhřimov)
Výkleky (Přerov)
Výprachtice (Ústí nad Orlicí)
Výrava (Hradec Králové)
Výrov (Plzeň-North)
Výrovice (Znojmo)
Vyšehněvice (Pardubice)
Vyšehoří (Šumperk)
Vyšehořovice (Prague-East)
Vyskeř (Semily)
Vyškov (town; Vyškov)
Výškov (Louny)
Vyškovec (Uherské Hradiště)
Vyskytná nad Jihlavou (Jihlava)
Vyskytná (Pelhřimov)
Výsluní (town; Chomutov)
Vyšní Lhoty (Frýdek-Místek)
Vysočany (Blansko)
Vysočany (Znojmo)
Vysočina (Chrudim)
Vysoká (Bruntál)
Vysoká (Havlíčkův Brod)
Vysoká (Mělník)
Vysoká (Svitavy)
Vysoká Lhota (Pelhřimov)
Vysoká Libyně (Plzeň-North)
Vysoká nad Labem (Hradec Králové)
Vysoká Pec (Chomutov)
Vysoká Pec (Karlovy Vary)
Vysoká Srbská (Náchod)
Vysoká u Příbramě (Příbram)
Vysoké Chvojno (Pardubice)
Vysoké Mýto (town; Ústí nad Orlicí)
Vysoké nad Jizerou (town; Semily)
Vysoké Pole (Zlín)
Vysoké Popovice (Brno-Country)
Vysoké Studnice (Jihlava)
Vysoké Veselí (town; Jičín)
Vysoké (Žďár nad Sázavou)
Vysokov (Náchod)
Vysoký Chlumec (market town; Příbram)
Vysoký Újezd (Benešov)
Vysoký Újezd (Beroun)
Vysoký Újezd (Hradec Králové)
Výšovice (Prostějov)
Vyšší Brod (town; Český Krumlov)
Vystrčenovice (Jihlava)
Vystrkov (Pelhřimov)
Výžerky (Kolín)
Vyžice (Chrudim)
Vyžlovka (Kolín)

X
Xaverov (Benešov)

Z

Žabčice (Brno-Country)
Žabeň (Frýdek-Místek)
Zábeštní Lhota (Přerov)
Záblatí (Jindřichův Hradec)
Záblatí (Prachatice)
Záblatí (Žďár nad Sázavou)
Žabonosy (Kolín)
Žabovřesky nad Ohří (Litoměřice)
Žabovřesky (České Budějovice)
Záboří (České Budějovice)
Záboří (Strakonice)
Záboří nad Labem (Kutná Hora)
Záborná (Jihlava)
Zábrdí (Prachatice)
Zábrodí (Náchod)
Zabrušany (Teplice)
Zábřeh (town; Šumperk)
Zábřezí-Řečice (Trutnov)
Žacléř (town; Trutnov)
Zadní Chodov (Tachov)
Zadní Střítež (Tábor)
Zadní Třebaň (Beroun)
Zadní Vydří (Jihlava)
Zadní Zhořec (Žďár nad Sázavou)
Zádolí (Ústí nad Orlicí)
Žádovice (Hodonín)
Zádub-Závišín (Cheb)
Zádveřice-Raková (Zlín)
Zahájí (České Budějovice)
Zahnašovice (Kroměříž)
Zahorčice (Strakonice)
Záhornice (Nymburk)
Záhorovice (Uherské Hradiště)
Zahořany (Domažlice)
Zahořany (Prague-West)
Záhoří (Jindřichův Hradec)
Záhoří (Písek)
Záhoří (Semily)
Záhoří (Tábor)
Zahrádka (Plzeň-North)
Zahrádka (Třebíč)
Zahrádky (Česká Lípa)
Zahrádky (Jindřichův Hradec)
Záchlumí (Tachov)
Záchlumí (Ústí nad Orlicí)
Zachotín (Pelhřimov)
Zachrašťany (Hradec Králové)
Zaječí (Břeclav)
Zaječice (Chrudim)
Zaječov (Beroun)
Zájezd (Kladno)
Zájezdec (Chrudim)
Zajíčkov (Pelhřimov)
Žákava (Plzeň-South)
Zákolany (Kladno)
Žákovice (Přerov)
Zakřany (Brno-Country)
Zákupy (town; Česká Lípa)
Žáky (Kutná Hora)
Žalany (Teplice)
Zálesí (Znojmo)
Zálesná Zhoř (Brno-Country)
Zalešany (Kolín)
Zálezlice (Mělník)
Zálezly (Prachatice)
Žalhostice (Litoměřice)
Žalkovice (Kroměříž)
Zaloňov (Náchod)
Zálší (Tábor)
Zálší (Ústí nad Orlicí)
Zalužany (Příbram)
Záluží (Beroun)
Záluží (Litoměřice)
Zálužice (Louny)
Žamberk (town; Ústí nad Orlicí)
Záměl (Rychnov nad Kněžnou)
Zámostí-Blata (Jičín)
Žampach (Ústí nad Orlicí)
Zámrsk (Ústí nad Orlicí)
Zámrsky (Přerov)
Žandov (town; Česká Lípa)
Zápy (market town; Prague-East)
Žár (České Budějovice)
Žáravice (Pardubice)
Zářecká Lhota (Ústí nad Orlicí)
Záříčí (Kroměříž)
Žarošice (Hodonín)
Žárovná (Prachatice)
Zárubice (Třebíč)
Záryby (Mělník)
Zásada (market town; Jablonec nad Nisou)
Zásmuky (town; Kolín)
Zastávka (Brno-Country)
Zástřizly (Kroměříž)
Zašová (Vsetín)
Zašovice (Třebíč)
Žatčany (Brno-Country)
Žatec (Jihlava)
Žatec (town; Louny)
Zátor (Bruntál)
Závada (Opava)
Zavidov (Rakovník)
Závist (Blansko)
Závišice (Nový Jičín)
Zavlekov (Klatovy)
Závraty (České Budějovice)
Zbečno (Rakovník)
Zbelítov (Písek)
Zbenice (Příbram)
Zběšičky (Písek)
Zbilidy (Jihlava)
Zbinohy (Jihlava)
Zbiroh (town; Rokycany)
Zbizuby (Kutná Hora)
Zblovice (Znojmo)
Zborov (Šumperk)
Zborovice (Kroměříž)
Zborovy (Klatovy)
Zbožíčko (Nymburk)
Zbraslav (Brno-Country)
Zbraslavec (Blansko)
Zbraslavice (Kutná Hora)
Zbrašín (Louny)
Zbůch (Plzeň-North)
Zbuzany (Prague-West)
Zbyslavice (Ostrava-City)
Zbýšov (town; Brno-Country)
Zbýšov (Kutná Hora)
Zbýšov (Vyškov)
Zbytiny (Prachatice)
Ždánice (town; Hodonín)
Ždánice (Kolín)
Ždánice (Žďár nad Sázavou)
Ždánov (Domažlice)
Žďár (Blansko)
Žďár (Jindřichův Hradec)
Žďár (Mladá Boleslav)
Žďár (Písek)
Žďár (Rakovník)
Žďár nad Metují (Náchod)
Žďár nad Orlicí (Rychnov nad Kněžnou)
Žďár nad Sázavou (town; Žďár nad Sázavou)
Žďárec (Brno-Country)
Žďárek (Liberec)
Žďárky (Náchod)
Žďárná (Blansko)
Zděchov (Vsetín)
Zdechovice (Hradec Králové)
Zdechovice (Pardubice)
Zdelov (Rychnov nad Kněžnou)
Zdemyslice (Plzeň-South)
Zdeňkov (Jihlava)
Zderaz (Chrudim)
Zdětín (Mladá Boleslav)
Zdětín (Prostějov)
Zdiby (Prague-East)
Zdice (town; Beroun)
Zdíkov (Prachatice)
Ždírec (Česká Lípa)
Ždírec (Havlíčkův Brod)
Ždírec (Jihlava)
Ždírec (Plzeň-South)
Ždírec nad Doubravou (town; Havlíčkův Brod)
Zdislava (market town; Liberec)
Zdislavice (market town; Benešov)
Zdobín (Trutnov)
Zdobnice (Rychnov nad Kněžnou)
Zdounky (Kroměříž)
Zduchovice (Příbram)
Žebrák (town; Beroun)
Žehuň (Nymburk)
Žehušice (market town; Kutná Hora)
Želatovice (Přerov)
Želeč (Prostějov)
Želeč (Tábor)
Želechovice (Olomouc)
Zelená Hora (Vyškov)
Zeleneč (Prague-East)
Zelenecká Lhota (Jičín)
Želenice (Kladno)
Želenice (Most)
Želešice (Brno-Country)
Želetava (market town; Třebíč)
Želetice (Hodonín)
Želetice (Znojmo)
Železná (Beroun)
Železná Ruda (town; Klatovy)
Železné (Brno-Country)
Železnice (town; Jičín)
Železný Brod (town; Jablonec nad Nisou)
Želiv (Pelhřimov)
Želivsko (Svitavy)
Želízy (Mělník)
Želkovice (Louny)
Želnava (Prachatice)
Zemětice (Plzeň-South)
Ženklava (Nový Jičín)
Žeranovice (Kroměříž)
Žeravice (Hodonín)
Žeraviny (Hodonín)
Žerčice (Mladá Boleslav)
Žeretice (Jičín)
Žermanice (Frýdek-Místek)
Žernov (market town; Náchod)
Žernov (Semily)
Žernovice (Prachatice)
Žernovník (Blansko)
Žerotice (Znojmo)
Žerotín (Louny)
Žerotín (Olomouc)
Žerůtky (Blansko)
Žerůtky (Znojmo)
Zhoř (Brno-Country)
Zhoř (Jihlava)
Zhoř (Písek)
Zhoř (Tachov)
Zhoř u Mladé Vožice (Tábor)
Zhoř u Tábora (Tábor)
Zhořec (Pelhřimov)
Židlochovice (town; Brno-Country)
Židněves (Mladá Boleslav)
Židovice (Jičín)
Židovice (Litoměřice)
Žihle (Plzeň-North)
Žihobce (Klatovy)
Žichlínek (Ústí nad Orlicí)
Zichovec (Kladno)
Žichovice (Klatovy)
Žilina (Kladno)
Žilov (Plzeň-North)
Žim (Teplice)
Žimutice (České Budějovice)
Žinkovy (market town; Plzeň-South)
Žirov (Pelhřimov)
Žirovnice (town; Pelhřimov)
Žíšov (Tábor)
Žitenice (Litoměřice)
Žítková (Uherské Hradiště)
Žitovlice (Nymburk)
Živanice (Pardubice)
Životice u Nového Jičína (Nový Jičín)
Životice (Plzeň-South)
Žiželice (Kolín)
Žiželice (Louny)
Žižice (Kladno)
Žižkovo Pole (Havlíčkův Brod)
Zlámanec (Uherské Hradiště)
Zlatá Koruna (Český Krumlov)
Zlatá Olešnice (Jablonec nad Nisou)
Zlatá Olešnice (Trutnov)
Zlatá (Prague-East)
Zlaté Hory (town; Jeseník)
Zlátenka (Pelhřimov)
Zlatníky-Hodkovice (Prague-West)
Žlebské Chvalovice (Chrudim)
Žleby (Kutná Hora)
Zlechov (Uherské Hradiště)
Zlín (city; Zlín)
Zliv (town; České Budějovice)
Zlobice (Kroměříž)
Zlončice (Mělník)
Zlonice (market town; Kladno)
Zlonín (Prague-East)
Zlosyň (Mělník)
Zlukov (Tábor)
Žlunice (Jičín)
Žlutava (Zlín)
Žlutice (town; Karlovy Vary)
Znětínek (Žďár nad Sázavou)
Znojmo (town; Znojmo)
Zruč-Senec (Plzeň-North)
Zruč nad Sázavou (town; Kutná Hora)
Zubčice (Český Krumlov)
Zubří (town; Vsetín)
Zubří (Žďár nad Sázavou)
Zubrnice (Ústí nad Labem)
Žulová (town; Jeseník)
Žumberk (market town; Chrudim)
Županovice (Jindřichův Hradec)
Županovice (Příbram)
Zvánovice (Prague-East)
Zvěrkovice (Třebíč)
Zvěrotice (Tábor)
Zvěřínek (Nymburk)
Zvěstov (Benešov)
Zvěstovice (Havlíčkův Brod)
Zvíkov (České Budějovice)
Zvíkov (Český Krumlov)
Zvíkovec (market town; Rokycany)
Zvíkovské Podhradí (Písek)
Zvole (Prague-West)
Zvole (Šumperk)
Zvole (Žďár nad Sázavou)
Zvoleněves (Kladno)
Zvolenovice (Jihlava)
Zvotoky (Strakonice)

See also
List of cities and towns in the Czech Republic

External links
Official list of municipalities maintained by the Czech Statistical Office

 
Municipalities, Czech Republic

Municipalities, List